

85001–85100 

|-bgcolor=#fefefe
| 85001 ||  || — || December 27, 2003 || Socorro || LINEAR || — || align=right | 1.1 km || 
|-id=002 bgcolor=#fefefe
| 85002 ||  || — || December 27, 2003 || Socorro || LINEAR || — || align=right | 1.5 km || 
|-id=003 bgcolor=#E9E9E9
| 85003 ||  || — || December 28, 2003 || Socorro || LINEAR || — || align=right | 5.7 km || 
|-id=004 bgcolor=#fefefe
| 85004 Crombie ||  ||  || December 29, 2003 || Catalina || CSS || — || align=right | 1.7 km || 
|-id=005 bgcolor=#E9E9E9
| 85005 ||  || — || December 29, 2003 || Socorro || LINEAR || — || align=right | 6.1 km || 
|-id=006 bgcolor=#d6d6d6
| 85006 ||  || — || December 29, 2003 || Socorro || LINEAR || — || align=right | 3.7 km || 
|-id=007 bgcolor=#E9E9E9
| 85007 ||  || — || January 13, 2004 || Anderson Mesa || LONEOS || ADE || align=right | 4.4 km || 
|-id=008 bgcolor=#d6d6d6
| 85008 ||  || — || January 16, 2004 || Palomar || NEAT || THM || align=right | 5.5 km || 
|-id=009 bgcolor=#E9E9E9
| 85009 ||  || — || January 16, 2004 || Palomar || NEAT || — || align=right | 2.9 km || 
|-id=010 bgcolor=#E9E9E9
| 85010 ||  || — || January 16, 2004 || Palomar || NEAT || — || align=right | 2.5 km || 
|-id=011 bgcolor=#E9E9E9
| 85011 ||  || — || January 18, 2004 || Palomar || NEAT || — || align=right | 4.5 km || 
|-id=012 bgcolor=#fefefe
| 85012 ||  || — || January 18, 2004 || Palomar || NEAT || FLO || align=right | 1.0 km || 
|-id=013 bgcolor=#d6d6d6
| 85013 ||  || — || January 19, 2004 || Kitt Peak || Spacewatch || — || align=right | 4.5 km || 
|-id=014 bgcolor=#E9E9E9
| 85014 Sutter ||  ||  || January 19, 2004 || Catalina || CSS || — || align=right | 5.0 km || 
|-id=015 bgcolor=#fefefe
| 85015 Gaskell ||  ||  || January 19, 2004 || Catalina || CSS || MAS || align=right | 1.5 km || 
|-id=016 bgcolor=#E9E9E9
| 85016 ||  || — || January 19, 2004 || Catalina || CSS || — || align=right | 7.1 km || 
|-id=017 bgcolor=#d6d6d6
| 85017 ||  || — || January 21, 2004 || Socorro || LINEAR || THM || align=right | 5.3 km || 
|-id=018 bgcolor=#E9E9E9
| 85018 ||  || — || January 22, 2004 || Socorro || LINEAR || — || align=right | 2.1 km || 
|-id=019 bgcolor=#E9E9E9
| 85019 || 2039 P-L || — || September 24, 1960 || Palomar || PLS || — || align=right | 2.4 km || 
|-id=020 bgcolor=#fefefe
| 85020 || 2057 P-L || — || September 24, 1960 || Palomar || PLS || FLO || align=right | 1.1 km || 
|-id=021 bgcolor=#E9E9E9
| 85021 || 2067 P-L || — || September 24, 1960 || Palomar || PLS || — || align=right | 5.6 km || 
|-id=022 bgcolor=#E9E9E9
| 85022 || 2068 P-L || — || September 24, 1960 || Palomar || PLS || — || align=right | 4.8 km || 
|-id=023 bgcolor=#d6d6d6
| 85023 || 2087 P-L || — || September 24, 1960 || Palomar || PLS || NAE || align=right | 6.5 km || 
|-id=024 bgcolor=#fefefe
| 85024 || 2224 P-L || — || September 24, 1960 || Palomar || PLS || — || align=right | 1.4 km || 
|-id=025 bgcolor=#d6d6d6
| 85025 || 2544 P-L || — || September 24, 1960 || Palomar || PLS || — || align=right | 5.5 km || 
|-id=026 bgcolor=#d6d6d6
| 85026 || 2653 P-L || — || September 24, 1960 || Palomar || PLS || HYG || align=right | 4.8 km || 
|-id=027 bgcolor=#fefefe
| 85027 || 2677 P-L || — || September 24, 1960 || Palomar || PLS || — || align=right | 3.3 km || 
|-id=028 bgcolor=#E9E9E9
| 85028 || 2729 P-L || — || September 24, 1960 || Palomar || PLS || — || align=right | 2.9 km || 
|-id=029 bgcolor=#d6d6d6
| 85029 || 2755 P-L || — || September 24, 1960 || Palomar || PLS || HYG || align=right | 5.4 km || 
|-id=030 bgcolor=#C2FFFF
| 85030 Admetos || 2804 P-L ||  || September 24, 1960 || Palomar || PLS || L4 || align=right | 21 km || 
|-id=031 bgcolor=#E9E9E9
| 85031 || 2860 P-L || — || September 24, 1960 || Palomar || PLS || EUN || align=right | 2.6 km || 
|-id=032 bgcolor=#E9E9E9
| 85032 || 3054 P-L || — || September 24, 1960 || Palomar || PLS || GEF || align=right | 3.5 km || 
|-id=033 bgcolor=#E9E9E9
| 85033 || 3073 P-L || — || September 24, 1960 || Palomar || PLS || EUN || align=right | 2.8 km || 
|-id=034 bgcolor=#d6d6d6
| 85034 || 3542 P-L || — || October 17, 1960 || Palomar || PLS || INA || align=right | 9.7 km || 
|-id=035 bgcolor=#E9E9E9
| 85035 || 4149 P-L || — || September 24, 1960 || Palomar || PLS || — || align=right | 1.6 km || 
|-id=036 bgcolor=#d6d6d6
| 85036 || 4203 P-L || — || September 24, 1960 || Palomar || PLS || ULA7:4 || align=right | 8.6 km || 
|-id=037 bgcolor=#fefefe
| 85037 || 4279 P-L || — || September 24, 1960 || Palomar || PLS || V || align=right | 1.1 km || 
|-id=038 bgcolor=#E9E9E9
| 85038 || 4313 P-L || — || September 24, 1960 || Palomar || PLS || — || align=right | 2.2 km || 
|-id=039 bgcolor=#E9E9E9
| 85039 || 4541 P-L || — || September 24, 1960 || Palomar || PLS || — || align=right | 5.0 km || 
|-id=040 bgcolor=#fefefe
| 85040 || 4617 P-L || — || September 24, 1960 || Palomar || PLS || FLO || align=right | 1.3 km || 
|-id=041 bgcolor=#d6d6d6
| 85041 || 4653 P-L || — || September 24, 1960 || Palomar || PLS || ALA || align=right | 9.0 km || 
|-id=042 bgcolor=#E9E9E9
| 85042 || 4779 P-L || — || September 24, 1960 || Palomar || PLS || AGN || align=right | 2.0 km || 
|-id=043 bgcolor=#fefefe
| 85043 || 4817 P-L || — || September 24, 1960 || Palomar || PLS || — || align=right | 2.0 km || 
|-id=044 bgcolor=#E9E9E9
| 85044 || 4829 P-L || — || September 24, 1960 || Palomar || PLS || — || align=right | 4.5 km || 
|-id=045 bgcolor=#E9E9E9
| 85045 || 5015 P-L || — || October 22, 1960 || Palomar || PLS || EUN || align=right | 2.3 km || 
|-id=046 bgcolor=#fefefe
| 85046 || 6126 P-L || — || September 24, 1960 || Palomar || PLS || FLO || align=right | 1.5 km || 
|-id=047 bgcolor=#fefefe
| 85047 Krakatau || 6255 P-L ||  || September 24, 1960 || Palomar || PLS || H || align=right | 1.4 km || 
|-id=048 bgcolor=#fefefe
| 85048 || 6265 P-L || — || September 24, 1960 || Palomar || PLS || V || align=right | 1.6 km || 
|-id=049 bgcolor=#fefefe
| 85049 || 6279 P-L || — || September 24, 1960 || Palomar || PLS || V || align=right | 1.4 km || 
|-id=050 bgcolor=#fefefe
| 85050 || 6572 P-L || — || September 24, 1960 || Palomar || PLS || — || align=right | 1.7 km || 
|-id=051 bgcolor=#E9E9E9
| 85051 || 6641 P-L || — || September 24, 1960 || Palomar || PLS || ADE || align=right | 3.8 km || 
|-id=052 bgcolor=#E9E9E9
| 85052 || 6778 P-L || — || September 24, 1960 || Palomar || PLS || PAE || align=right | 6.1 km || 
|-id=053 bgcolor=#d6d6d6
| 85053 || 6789 P-L || — || September 24, 1960 || Palomar || PLS || — || align=right | 5.8 km || 
|-id=054 bgcolor=#fefefe
| 85054 || 6841 P-L || — || September 24, 1960 || Palomar || PLS || FLO || align=right | 1.2 km || 
|-id=055 bgcolor=#E9E9E9
| 85055 || 6872 P-L || — || September 24, 1960 || Palomar || PLS || — || align=right | 5.4 km || 
|-id=056 bgcolor=#fefefe
| 85056 || 9093 P-L || — || September 24, 1960 || Palomar || PLS || NYS || align=right | 1.5 km || 
|-id=057 bgcolor=#d6d6d6
| 85057 || 9608 P-L || — || October 17, 1960 || Palomar || PLS || — || align=right | 6.0 km || 
|-id=058 bgcolor=#E9E9E9
| 85058 || 1112 T-1 || — || March 25, 1971 || Palomar || PLS || — || align=right | 5.4 km || 
|-id=059 bgcolor=#fefefe
| 85059 || 1211 T-1 || — || March 25, 1971 || Palomar || PLS || NYS || align=right | 4.1 km || 
|-id=060 bgcolor=#E9E9E9
| 85060 || 2080 T-1 || — || March 25, 1971 || Palomar || PLS || — || align=right | 1.9 km || 
|-id=061 bgcolor=#d6d6d6
| 85061 || 2137 T-1 || — || March 25, 1971 || Palomar || PLS || — || align=right | 4.2 km || 
|-id=062 bgcolor=#fefefe
| 85062 || 2272 T-1 || — || March 25, 1971 || Palomar || PLS || NYS || align=right | 1.5 km || 
|-id=063 bgcolor=#d6d6d6
| 85063 || 3148 T-1 || — || March 26, 1971 || Palomar || PLS || EUP || align=right | 8.0 km || 
|-id=064 bgcolor=#fefefe
| 85064 || 3338 T-1 || — || March 26, 1971 || Palomar || PLS || NYS || align=right | 1.6 km || 
|-id=065 bgcolor=#E9E9E9
| 85065 || 4053 T-1 || — || March 26, 1971 || Palomar || PLS || — || align=right | 4.9 km || 
|-id=066 bgcolor=#fefefe
| 85066 || 4255 T-1 || — || March 26, 1971 || Palomar || PLS || — || align=right | 1.7 km || 
|-id=067 bgcolor=#d6d6d6
| 85067 || 4333 T-1 || — || March 26, 1971 || Palomar || PLS || THM || align=right | 4.6 km || 
|-id=068 bgcolor=#fefefe
| 85068 || 1021 T-2 || — || September 29, 1973 || Palomar || PLS || — || align=right | 1.7 km || 
|-id=069 bgcolor=#E9E9E9
| 85069 || 1056 T-2 || — || September 29, 1973 || Palomar || PLS || AGN || align=right | 2.9 km || 
|-id=070 bgcolor=#E9E9E9
| 85070 || 1120 T-2 || — || September 30, 1973 || Palomar || PLS || — || align=right | 1.9 km || 
|-id=071 bgcolor=#fefefe
| 85071 || 1189 T-2 || — || September 29, 1973 || Palomar || PLS || — || align=right | 1.5 km || 
|-id=072 bgcolor=#E9E9E9
| 85072 || 1245 T-2 || — || September 29, 1973 || Palomar || PLS || — || align=right | 2.0 km || 
|-id=073 bgcolor=#fefefe
| 85073 || 1263 T-2 || — || September 29, 1973 || Palomar || PLS || — || align=right | 1.4 km || 
|-id=074 bgcolor=#E9E9E9
| 85074 || 1288 T-2 || — || September 29, 1973 || Palomar || PLS || AST || align=right | 4.6 km || 
|-id=075 bgcolor=#d6d6d6
| 85075 || 1444 T-2 || — || September 29, 1973 || Palomar || PLS || — || align=right | 7.0 km || 
|-id=076 bgcolor=#E9E9E9
| 85076 || 1451 T-2 || — || September 30, 1973 || Palomar || PLS || — || align=right | 1.8 km || 
|-id=077 bgcolor=#fefefe
| 85077 || 1454 T-2 || — || September 29, 1973 || Palomar || PLS || V || align=right | 1.2 km || 
|-id=078 bgcolor=#fefefe
| 85078 || 1509 T-2 || — || September 29, 1973 || Palomar || PLS || — || align=right | 1.4 km || 
|-id=079 bgcolor=#E9E9E9
| 85079 || 2047 T-2 || — || September 29, 1973 || Palomar || PLS || — || align=right | 2.2 km || 
|-id=080 bgcolor=#d6d6d6
| 85080 || 2070 T-2 || — || September 29, 1973 || Palomar || PLS || — || align=right | 3.9 km || 
|-id=081 bgcolor=#d6d6d6
| 85081 || 2153 T-2 || — || September 29, 1973 || Palomar || PLS || HYG || align=right | 5.6 km || 
|-id=082 bgcolor=#fefefe
| 85082 || 2158 T-2 || — || September 29, 1973 || Palomar || PLS || NYS || align=right | 3.0 km || 
|-id=083 bgcolor=#fefefe
| 85083 || 2305 T-2 || — || September 29, 1973 || Palomar || PLS || NYS || align=right | 1.4 km || 
|-id=084 bgcolor=#E9E9E9
| 85084 || 2309 T-2 || — || September 29, 1973 || Palomar || PLS || — || align=right | 4.8 km || 
|-id=085 bgcolor=#d6d6d6
| 85085 || 3014 T-2 || — || September 30, 1973 || Palomar || PLS || — || align=right | 6.7 km || 
|-id=086 bgcolor=#d6d6d6
| 85086 || 3059 T-2 || — || September 30, 1973 || Palomar || PLS || — || align=right | 7.2 km || 
|-id=087 bgcolor=#fefefe
| 85087 || 3090 T-2 || — || September 30, 1973 || Palomar || PLS || MAS || align=right | 1.3 km || 
|-id=088 bgcolor=#E9E9E9
| 85088 || 3202 T-2 || — || September 30, 1973 || Palomar || PLS || — || align=right | 4.9 km || 
|-id=089 bgcolor=#d6d6d6
| 85089 || 3304 T-2 || — || September 30, 1973 || Palomar || PLS || KOR || align=right | 3.0 km || 
|-id=090 bgcolor=#fefefe
| 85090 || 4028 T-2 || — || September 29, 1973 || Palomar || PLS || NYS || align=right | 4.1 km || 
|-id=091 bgcolor=#d6d6d6
| 85091 || 4112 T-2 || — || September 29, 1973 || Palomar || PLS || HYG || align=right | 5.6 km || 
|-id=092 bgcolor=#fefefe
| 85092 || 4253 T-2 || — || September 29, 1973 || Palomar || PLS || — || align=right | 1.8 km || 
|-id=093 bgcolor=#fefefe
| 85093 || 5071 T-2 || — || September 25, 1973 || Palomar || PLS || V || align=right | 1.6 km || 
|-id=094 bgcolor=#fefefe
| 85094 || 5119 T-2 || — || September 25, 1973 || Palomar || PLS || V || align=right | 1.7 km || 
|-id=095 bgcolor=#fefefe
| 85095 Hekla || 5192 T-2 ||  || September 25, 1973 || Palomar || PLS || H || align=right | 1.0 km || 
|-id=096 bgcolor=#fefefe
| 85096 || 1044 T-3 || — || October 17, 1977 || Palomar || PLS || — || align=right | 1.8 km || 
|-id=097 bgcolor=#E9E9E9
| 85097 || 1082 T-3 || — || October 17, 1977 || Palomar || PLS || RAF || align=right | 1.8 km || 
|-id=098 bgcolor=#d6d6d6
| 85098 || 1208 T-3 || — || October 17, 1977 || Palomar || PLS || — || align=right | 6.9 km || 
|-id=099 bgcolor=#fefefe
| 85099 || 1213 T-3 || — || October 17, 1977 || Palomar || PLS || V || align=right | 1.4 km || 
|-id=100 bgcolor=#E9E9E9
| 85100 || 2189 T-3 || — || October 16, 1977 || Palomar || PLS || — || align=right | 2.0 km || 
|}

85101–85200 

|-bgcolor=#fefefe
| 85101 || 2192 T-3 || — || October 16, 1977 || Palomar || PLS || NYS || align=right | 1.3 km || 
|-id=102 bgcolor=#E9E9E9
| 85102 || 2211 T-3 || — || October 16, 1977 || Palomar || PLS || — || align=right | 2.2 km || 
|-id=103 bgcolor=#E9E9E9
| 85103 || 2412 T-3 || — || October 16, 1977 || Palomar || PLS || GEF || align=right | 6.7 km || 
|-id=104 bgcolor=#E9E9E9
| 85104 || 2415 T-3 || — || October 16, 1977 || Palomar || PLS || — || align=right | 3.0 km || 
|-id=105 bgcolor=#E9E9E9
| 85105 || 2433 T-3 || — || October 16, 1977 || Palomar || PLS || — || align=right | 2.4 km || 
|-id=106 bgcolor=#E9E9E9
| 85106 || 3038 T-3 || — || October 16, 1977 || Palomar || PLS || — || align=right | 2.0 km || 
|-id=107 bgcolor=#E9E9E9
| 85107 || 3144 T-3 || — || October 16, 1977 || Palomar || PLS || — || align=right | 1.9 km || 
|-id=108 bgcolor=#d6d6d6
| 85108 || 3475 T-3 || — || October 16, 1977 || Palomar || PLS || — || align=right | 5.2 km || 
|-id=109 bgcolor=#d6d6d6
| 85109 || 3892 T-3 || — || October 16, 1977 || Palomar || PLS || BRA || align=right | 4.2 km || 
|-id=110 bgcolor=#fefefe
| 85110 || 4043 T-3 || — || October 16, 1977 || Palomar || PLS || — || align=right | 1.7 km || 
|-id=111 bgcolor=#E9E9E9
| 85111 || 4051 T-3 || — || October 16, 1977 || Palomar || PLS || — || align=right | 3.4 km || 
|-id=112 bgcolor=#d6d6d6
| 85112 || 4060 T-3 || — || October 16, 1977 || Palomar || PLS || KOR || align=right | 3.3 km || 
|-id=113 bgcolor=#fefefe
| 85113 || 4116 T-3 || — || October 16, 1977 || Palomar || PLS || — || align=right | 2.3 km || 
|-id=114 bgcolor=#d6d6d6
| 85114 || 4285 T-3 || — || October 16, 1977 || Palomar || PLS || — || align=right | 4.2 km || 
|-id=115 bgcolor=#E9E9E9
| 85115 || 4329 T-3 || — || October 16, 1977 || Palomar || PLS || HNA || align=right | 5.8 km || 
|-id=116 bgcolor=#E9E9E9
| 85116 || 4342 T-3 || — || October 16, 1977 || Palomar || PLS || — || align=right | 2.3 km || 
|-id=117 bgcolor=#E9E9E9
| 85117 || 5135 T-3 || — || October 16, 1977 || Palomar || PLS || — || align=right | 2.2 km || 
|-id=118 bgcolor=#FA8072
| 85118 || 1971 UU || — || October 26, 1971 || Hamburg-Bergedorf || L. Kohoutek || — || align=right | 4.8 km || 
|-id=119 bgcolor=#FA8072
| 85119 Hannieschaft || 1972 RD ||  || September 15, 1972 || Palomar || T. Gehrels || H || align=right | 1.4 km || 
|-id=120 bgcolor=#E9E9E9
| 85120 ||  || — || September 30, 1975 || Palomar || S. J. Bus || — || align=right | 2.0 km || 
|-id=121 bgcolor=#fefefe
| 85121 Loehde ||  ||  || May 27, 1976 || Siding Spring || A. Lowe || V || align=right | 1.1 km || 
|-id=122 bgcolor=#d6d6d6
| 85122 ||  || — || October 27, 1978 || Palomar || C. M. Olmstead || URS || align=right | 6.6 km || 
|-id=123 bgcolor=#fefefe
| 85123 ||  || — || November 7, 1978 || Palomar || E. F. Helin, S. J. Bus || — || align=right | 1.6 km || 
|-id=124 bgcolor=#fefefe
| 85124 ||  || — || November 7, 1978 || Palomar || E. F. Helin, S. J. Bus || — || align=right | 1.7 km || 
|-id=125 bgcolor=#E9E9E9
| 85125 ||  || — || November 7, 1978 || Palomar || E. F. Helin, S. J. Bus || — || align=right | 2.1 km || 
|-id=126 bgcolor=#E9E9E9
| 85126 ||  || — || November 7, 1978 || Palomar || E. F. Helin, S. J. Bus || RAF || align=right | 1.6 km || 
|-id=127 bgcolor=#E9E9E9
| 85127 ||  || — || November 7, 1978 || Palomar || E. F. Helin, S. J. Bus || PAD || align=right | 5.9 km || 
|-id=128 bgcolor=#fefefe
| 85128 || 1979 HA || — || April 21, 1979 || Palomar || D. Zelinsky || PHO || align=right | 5.3 km || 
|-id=129 bgcolor=#fefefe
| 85129 ||  || — || June 25, 1979 || Siding Spring || E. F. Helin, S. J. Bus || — || align=right | 1.7 km || 
|-id=130 bgcolor=#E9E9E9
| 85130 ||  || — || June 25, 1979 || Siding Spring || E. F. Helin, S. J. Bus || — || align=right | 2.3 km || 
|-id=131 bgcolor=#E9E9E9
| 85131 ||  || — || June 25, 1979 || Siding Spring || E. F. Helin, S. J. Bus || — || align=right | 3.9 km || 
|-id=132 bgcolor=#fefefe
| 85132 ||  || — || June 25, 1979 || Siding Spring || E. F. Helin, S. J. Bus || — || align=right | 1.7 km || 
|-id=133 bgcolor=#E9E9E9
| 85133 ||  || — || June 25, 1979 || Siding Spring || E. F. Helin, S. J. Bus || KON || align=right | 4.4 km || 
|-id=134 bgcolor=#fefefe
| 85134 ||  || — || June 25, 1979 || Siding Spring || E. F. Helin, S. J. Bus || NYS || align=right data-sort-value="0.95" | 950 m || 
|-id=135 bgcolor=#fefefe
| 85135 ||  || — || August 22, 1979 || La Silla || C.-I. Lagerkvist || — || align=right | 2.0 km || 
|-id=136 bgcolor=#fefefe
| 85136 ||  || — || August 22, 1979 || La Silla || C.-I. Lagerkvist || — || align=right | 2.3 km || 
|-id=137 bgcolor=#d6d6d6
| 85137 ||  || — || February 28, 1981 || Siding Spring || S. J. Bus || — || align=right | 3.5 km || 
|-id=138 bgcolor=#d6d6d6
| 85138 ||  || — || March 6, 1981 || Siding Spring || S. J. Bus || — || align=right | 6.7 km || 
|-id=139 bgcolor=#fefefe
| 85139 ||  || — || March 1, 1981 || Siding Spring || S. J. Bus || — || align=right | 1.7 km || 
|-id=140 bgcolor=#fefefe
| 85140 ||  || — || March 2, 1981 || Siding Spring || S. J. Bus || — || align=right | 1.6 km || 
|-id=141 bgcolor=#d6d6d6
| 85141 ||  || — || March 6, 1981 || Siding Spring || S. J. Bus || EUP || align=right | 6.6 km || 
|-id=142 bgcolor=#d6d6d6
| 85142 ||  || — || March 1, 1981 || Siding Spring || S. J. Bus || 3:2 || align=right | 6.8 km || 
|-id=143 bgcolor=#fefefe
| 85143 ||  || — || March 2, 1981 || Siding Spring || S. J. Bus || — || align=right | 2.4 km || 
|-id=144 bgcolor=#fefefe
| 85144 ||  || — || March 2, 1981 || Siding Spring || S. J. Bus || V || align=right | 1.9 km || 
|-id=145 bgcolor=#fefefe
| 85145 ||  || — || March 1, 1981 || Siding Spring || S. J. Bus || V || align=right | 1.8 km || 
|-id=146 bgcolor=#fefefe
| 85146 ||  || — || March 1, 1981 || Siding Spring || S. J. Bus || — || align=right | 1.3 km || 
|-id=147 bgcolor=#d6d6d6
| 85147 ||  || — || March 1, 1981 || Siding Spring || S. J. Bus || HYG || align=right | 5.8 km || 
|-id=148 bgcolor=#fefefe
| 85148 ||  || — || March 2, 1981 || Siding Spring || S. J. Bus || — || align=right | 1.3 km || 
|-id=149 bgcolor=#E9E9E9
| 85149 ||  || — || March 6, 1981 || Siding Spring || S. J. Bus || — || align=right | 4.6 km || 
|-id=150 bgcolor=#d6d6d6
| 85150 ||  || — || March 2, 1981 || Siding Spring || S. J. Bus || THM || align=right | 4.7 km || 
|-id=151 bgcolor=#E9E9E9
| 85151 || 1983 QT || — || August 30, 1983 || Palomar || J. Gibson || — || align=right | 2.3 km || 
|-id=152 bgcolor=#fefefe
| 85152 ||  || — || August 16, 1985 || Palomar || E. F. Helin || — || align=right | 4.5 km || 
|-id=153 bgcolor=#fefefe
| 85153 || 1985 TA || — || October 12, 1985 || Kitt Peak || Spacewatch || — || align=right | 4.8 km || 
|-id=154 bgcolor=#fefefe
| 85154 ||  || — || October 11, 1986 || Brorfelde || P. Jensen || — || align=right | 6.5 km || 
|-id=155 bgcolor=#fefefe
| 85155 ||  || — || November 7, 1986 || Kleť || A. Mrkos || NYS || align=right | 1.9 km || 
|-id=156 bgcolor=#E9E9E9
| 85156 ||  || — || September 13, 1987 || La Silla || H. Debehogne || — || align=right | 4.7 km || 
|-id=157 bgcolor=#fefefe
| 85157 ||  || — || September 30, 1987 || Brorfelde || P. Jensen || — || align=right | 1.8 km || 
|-id=158 bgcolor=#FA8072
| 85158 Phyllistrapp ||  ||  || October 17, 1987 || Palomar || C. S. Shoemaker || — || align=right | 2.1 km || 
|-id=159 bgcolor=#E9E9E9
| 85159 || 1988 DL || — || February 22, 1988 || Siding Spring || R. H. McNaught || GEF || align=right | 4.0 km || 
|-id=160 bgcolor=#E9E9E9
| 85160 ||  || — || September 14, 1988 || Cerro Tololo || S. J. Bus || — || align=right | 2.8 km || 
|-id=161 bgcolor=#fefefe
| 85161 ||  || — || September 16, 1988 || Cerro Tololo || S. J. Bus || FLO || align=right | 1.3 km || 
|-id=162 bgcolor=#d6d6d6
| 85162 ||  || — || September 16, 1988 || Cerro Tololo || S. J. Bus || SHU3:2 || align=right | 11 km || 
|-id=163 bgcolor=#d6d6d6
| 85163 ||  || — || September 16, 1988 || Cerro Tololo || S. J. Bus || HIL3:2 || align=right | 12 km || 
|-id=164 bgcolor=#E9E9E9
| 85164 ||  || — || October 3, 1988 || Kleť || A. Mrkos || — || align=right | 4.1 km || 
|-id=165 bgcolor=#FA8072
| 85165 ||  || — || October 7, 1988 || Palomar || C. S. Shoemaker || — || align=right | 2.5 km || 
|-id=166 bgcolor=#fefefe
| 85166 || 1989 OC || — || July 21, 1989 || Siding Spring || R. H. McNaught || — || align=right | 2.7 km || 
|-id=167 bgcolor=#fefefe
| 85167 ||  || — || September 7, 1989 || Kleť || A. Mrkos || KLI || align=right | 5.5 km || 
|-id=168 bgcolor=#d6d6d6
| 85168 Albertacentenary ||  ||  || September 2, 1989 || Palomar || A. Lowe || — || align=right | 6.7 km || 
|-id=169 bgcolor=#d6d6d6
| 85169 ||  || — || September 26, 1989 || La Silla || E. W. Elst || MEL || align=right | 6.9 km || 
|-id=170 bgcolor=#fefefe
| 85170 ||  || — || October 7, 1989 || La Silla || E. W. Elst || — || align=right | 1.8 km || 
|-id=171 bgcolor=#E9E9E9
| 85171 ||  || — || October 7, 1989 || La Silla || E. W. Elst || — || align=right | 3.9 km || 
|-id=172 bgcolor=#fefefe
| 85172 ||  || — || August 20, 1990 || La Silla || E. W. Elst || NYS || align=right | 1.4 km || 
|-id=173 bgcolor=#E9E9E9
| 85173 ||  || — || August 20, 1990 || La Silla || E. W. Elst || — || align=right | 2.6 km || 
|-id=174 bgcolor=#fefefe
| 85174 ||  || — || August 16, 1990 || La Silla || E. W. Elst || NYS || align=right | 1.1 km || 
|-id=175 bgcolor=#fefefe
| 85175 || 1990 RS || — || September 13, 1990 || Palomar || C. M. Olmstead || — || align=right | 2.9 km || 
|-id=176 bgcolor=#fefefe
| 85176 ||  || — || September 15, 1990 || Palomar || H. E. Holt || — || align=right | 2.0 km || 
|-id=177 bgcolor=#E9E9E9
| 85177 ||  || — || September 18, 1990 || Palomar || H. E. Holt || — || align=right | 7.3 km || 
|-id=178 bgcolor=#fefefe
| 85178 || 1990 TQ || — || October 10, 1990 || Kitami || K. Endate, K. Watanabe || — || align=right | 2.2 km || 
|-id=179 bgcolor=#fefefe
| 85179 Meistereckhart ||  ||  || October 11, 1990 || Tautenburg Observatory || F. Börngen, L. D. Schmadel || NYS || align=right | 3.2 km || 
|-id=180 bgcolor=#fefefe
| 85180 ||  || — || October 26, 1990 || Oohira || T. Urata || — || align=right | 2.2 km || 
|-id=181 bgcolor=#fefefe
| 85181 ||  || — || November 15, 1990 || La Silla || E. W. Elst || — || align=right | 2.9 km || 
|-id=182 bgcolor=#FFC2E0
| 85182 || 1991 AQ || — || January 14, 1991 || Palomar || E. F. Helin || APO +1kmPHA || align=right | 1.1 km || 
|-id=183 bgcolor=#fefefe
| 85183 Marcelaymé ||  ||  || January 18, 1991 || Haute Provence || E. W. Elst || PHO || align=right | 2.6 km || 
|-id=184 bgcolor=#FFC2E0
| 85184 ||  || — || May 9, 1991 || Palomar || E. F. Helin || AMO || align=right data-sort-value="0.73" | 730 m || 
|-id=185 bgcolor=#FA8072
| 85185 Lederman ||  ||  || June 6, 1991 || La Silla || E. W. Elst || — || align=right | 1.5 km || 
|-id=186 bgcolor=#E9E9E9
| 85186 ||  || — || August 2, 1991 || La Silla || E. W. Elst || — || align=right | 6.3 km || 
|-id=187 bgcolor=#E9E9E9
| 85187 ||  || — || August 7, 1991 || Palomar || H. E. Holt || — || align=right | 4.7 km || 
|-id=188 bgcolor=#E9E9E9
| 85188 ||  || — || August 7, 1991 || Palomar || H. E. Holt || GEF || align=right | 3.8 km || 
|-id=189 bgcolor=#E9E9E9
| 85189 ||  || — || September 4, 1991 || Palomar || E. F. Helin || — || align=right | 3.6 km || 
|-id=190 bgcolor=#E9E9E9
| 85190 Birgitroth ||  ||  || September 12, 1991 || Tautenburg Observatory || F. Börngen, L. D. Schmadel || EUN || align=right | 3.6 km || 
|-id=191 bgcolor=#E9E9E9
| 85191 ||  || — || September 7, 1991 || Kushiro || S. Ueda, H. Kaneda || — || align=right | 3.8 km || 
|-id=192 bgcolor=#E9E9E9
| 85192 ||  || — || September 4, 1991 || La Silla || E. W. Elst || — || align=right | 2.7 km || 
|-id=193 bgcolor=#fefefe
| 85193 ||  || — || September 14, 1991 || Palomar || H. E. Holt || — || align=right | 3.7 km || 
|-id=194 bgcolor=#E9E9E9
| 85194 ||  || — || October 5, 1991 || Palomar || C. S. Shoemaker || — || align=right | 7.0 km || 
|-id=195 bgcolor=#fefefe
| 85195 von Helfta ||  ||  || October 7, 1991 || Tautenburg Observatory || F. Börngen, L. D. Schmadel || — || align=right | 2.6 km || 
|-id=196 bgcolor=#E9E9E9
| 85196 Halle ||  ||  || October 4, 1991 || Tautenburg Observatory || F. Börngen, L. D. Schmadel || JUN || align=right | 3.2 km || 
|-id=197 bgcolor=#fefefe
| 85197 Ginkgo ||  ||  || October 5, 1991 || Tautenburg Observatory || F. Börngen, L. D. Schmadel || — || align=right | 1.3 km || 
|-id=198 bgcolor=#d6d6d6
| 85198 Weltenburg ||  ||  || October 2, 1991 || Tautenburg Observatory || F. Börngen, L. D. Schmadel || EOS || align=right | 4.8 km || 
|-id=199 bgcolor=#fefefe
| 85199 Habsburg ||  ||  || October 3, 1991 || Tautenburg Observatory || F. Börngen, L. D. Schmadel || FLO || align=right | 1.4 km || 
|-id=200 bgcolor=#E9E9E9
| 85200 Johnhault ||  ||  || October 6, 1991 || Palomar || A. Lowe || — || align=right | 1.8 km || 
|}

85201–85300 

|-bgcolor=#fefefe
| 85201 ||  || — || November 4, 1991 || Kitt Peak || Spacewatch || NYS || align=right | 1.4 km || 
|-id=202 bgcolor=#d6d6d6
| 85202 ||  || — || February 29, 1992 || La Silla || UESAC || EOS || align=right | 3.4 km || 
|-id=203 bgcolor=#fefefe
| 85203 ||  || — || March 1, 1992 || La Silla || UESAC || — || align=right | 2.1 km || 
|-id=204 bgcolor=#d6d6d6
| 85204 ||  || — || March 2, 1992 || La Silla || UESAC || EOS || align=right | 4.9 km || 
|-id=205 bgcolor=#fefefe
| 85205 ||  || — || March 1, 1992 || La Silla || UESAC || NYS || align=right | 1.5 km || 
|-id=206 bgcolor=#d6d6d6
| 85206 ||  || — || March 1, 1992 || La Silla || UESAC || — || align=right | 4.7 km || 
|-id=207 bgcolor=#fefefe
| 85207 ||  || — || March 1, 1992 || La Silla || UESAC || — || align=right | 2.0 km || 
|-id=208 bgcolor=#d6d6d6
| 85208 ||  || — || March 1, 1992 || La Silla || UESAC || HYG || align=right | 5.1 km || 
|-id=209 bgcolor=#fefefe
| 85209 ||  || — || April 4, 1992 || La Silla || E. W. Elst || — || align=right | 2.7 km || 
|-id=210 bgcolor=#fefefe
| 85210 ||  || — || April 26, 1992 || Kitt Peak || Spacewatch || — || align=right | 1.9 km || 
|-id=211 bgcolor=#E9E9E9
| 85211 || 1992 PL || — || August 8, 1992 || Caussols || E. W. Elst || — || align=right | 4.5 km || 
|-id=212 bgcolor=#E9E9E9
| 85212 || 1992 RF || — || September 4, 1992 || Siding Spring || R. H. McNaught || — || align=right | 3.2 km || 
|-id=213 bgcolor=#d6d6d6
| 85213 ||  || — || September 2, 1992 || La Silla || E. W. Elst || HYG || align=right | 6.8 km || 
|-id=214 bgcolor=#fefefe
| 85214 Sommersdorf ||  ||  || September 21, 1992 || Tautenburg Observatory || F. Börngen, L. D. Schmadel || — || align=right | 3.5 km || 
|-id=215 bgcolor=#E9E9E9
| 85215 Hohenzollern ||  ||  || September 26, 1992 || Tautenburg Observatory || F. Börngen, L. D. Schmadel || — || align=right | 4.0 km || 
|-id=216 bgcolor=#fefefe
| 85216 Schein ||  ||  || September 24, 1992 || Tautenburg Observatory || F. Börngen, L. D. Schmadel || — || align=right | 1.4 km || 
|-id=217 bgcolor=#fefefe
| 85217 Bilzingsleben ||  ||  || October 31, 1992 || Tautenburg Observatory || F. Börngen || — || align=right | 2.0 km || 
|-id=218 bgcolor=#d6d6d6
| 85218 ||  || — || March 17, 1993 || La Silla || UESAC || — || align=right | 5.7 km || 
|-id=219 bgcolor=#fefefe
| 85219 ||  || — || March 17, 1993 || La Silla || UESAC || — || align=right | 1.6 km || 
|-id=220 bgcolor=#fefefe
| 85220 ||  || — || March 17, 1993 || La Silla || UESAC || ERI || align=right | 3.8 km || 
|-id=221 bgcolor=#fefefe
| 85221 ||  || — || March 17, 1993 || La Silla || UESAC || — || align=right | 1.6 km || 
|-id=222 bgcolor=#fefefe
| 85222 ||  || — || March 17, 1993 || La Silla || UESAC || — || align=right | 1.4 km || 
|-id=223 bgcolor=#fefefe
| 85223 ||  || — || March 21, 1993 || La Silla || UESAC || NYS || align=right | 1.3 km || 
|-id=224 bgcolor=#fefefe
| 85224 ||  || — || March 21, 1993 || La Silla || UESAC || — || align=right | 2.8 km || 
|-id=225 bgcolor=#fefefe
| 85225 ||  || — || March 19, 1993 || La Silla || UESAC || — || align=right | 1.7 km || 
|-id=226 bgcolor=#d6d6d6
| 85226 ||  || — || March 19, 1993 || La Silla || UESAC || — || align=right | 4.6 km || 
|-id=227 bgcolor=#d6d6d6
| 85227 ||  || — || March 19, 1993 || La Silla || UESAC || — || align=right | 5.4 km || 
|-id=228 bgcolor=#d6d6d6
| 85228 ||  || — || March 19, 1993 || La Silla || UESAC || — || align=right | 4.4 km || 
|-id=229 bgcolor=#d6d6d6
| 85229 ||  || — || March 19, 1993 || La Silla || UESAC || KOR || align=right | 2.6 km || 
|-id=230 bgcolor=#d6d6d6
| 85230 ||  || — || March 17, 1993 || La Silla || UESAC || — || align=right | 4.6 km || 
|-id=231 bgcolor=#fefefe
| 85231 ||  || — || March 17, 1993 || La Silla || UESAC || — || align=right | 1.3 km || 
|-id=232 bgcolor=#fefefe
| 85232 ||  || — || March 17, 1993 || La Silla || UESAC || NYS || align=right | 1.3 km || 
|-id=233 bgcolor=#fefefe
| 85233 ||  || — || March 17, 1993 || La Silla || UESAC || — || align=right | 1.4 km || 
|-id=234 bgcolor=#fefefe
| 85234 ||  || — || April 19, 1993 || Kitt Peak || Spacewatch || — || align=right | 2.6 km || 
|-id=235 bgcolor=#FA8072
| 85235 || 1993 JA || — || May 13, 1993 || Kitt Peak || Spacewatch || H || align=right | 1.1 km || 
|-id=236 bgcolor=#FFC2E0
| 85236 || 1993 KH || — || May 24, 1993 || Siding Spring || R. H. McNaught || APOPHA || align=right data-sort-value="0.65" | 650 m || 
|-id=237 bgcolor=#fefefe
| 85237 ||  || — || July 12, 1993 || La Silla || E. W. Elst || — || align=right | 1.9 km || 
|-id=238 bgcolor=#d6d6d6
| 85238 ||  || — || July 25, 1993 || Kitt Peak || Spacewatch || — || align=right | 5.6 km || 
|-id=239 bgcolor=#d6d6d6
| 85239 ||  || — || July 20, 1993 || La Silla || E. W. Elst || — || align=right | 4.6 km || 
|-id=240 bgcolor=#d6d6d6
| 85240 ||  || — || July 19, 1993 || La Silla || E. W. Elst || — || align=right | 3.5 km || 
|-id=241 bgcolor=#fefefe
| 85241 ||  || — || August 14, 1993 || Caussols || E. W. Elst || ERI || align=right | 4.3 km || 
|-id=242 bgcolor=#fefefe
| 85242 ||  || — || August 18, 1993 || Caussols || E. W. Elst || NYS || align=right | 1.5 km || 
|-id=243 bgcolor=#d6d6d6
| 85243 ||  || — || August 20, 1993 || La Silla || E. W. Elst || — || align=right | 3.1 km || 
|-id=244 bgcolor=#fefefe
| 85244 ||  || — || August 20, 1993 || La Silla || E. W. Elst || V || align=right | 1.5 km || 
|-id=245 bgcolor=#fefefe
| 85245 ||  || — || September 14, 1993 || Palomar || E. F. Helin || PHO || align=right | 2.8 km || 
|-id=246 bgcolor=#fefefe
| 85246 ||  || — || September 15, 1993 || La Silla || E. W. Elst || — || align=right | 5.3 km || 
|-id=247 bgcolor=#fefefe
| 85247 ||  || — || September 15, 1993 || La Silla || E. W. Elst || NYS || align=right | 1.5 km || 
|-id=248 bgcolor=#E9E9E9
| 85248 ||  || — || September 15, 1993 || La Silla || E. W. Elst || — || align=right | 3.3 km || 
|-id=249 bgcolor=#fefefe
| 85249 ||  || — || September 14, 1993 || La Silla || H. Debehogne, E. W. Elst || NYS || align=right | 1.8 km || 
|-id=250 bgcolor=#d6d6d6
| 85250 ||  || — || September 15, 1993 || La Silla || H. Debehogne, E. W. Elst || — || align=right | 5.3 km || 
|-id=251 bgcolor=#E9E9E9
| 85251 ||  || — || September 15, 1993 || La Silla || H. Debehogne, E. W. Elst || — || align=right | 4.7 km || 
|-id=252 bgcolor=#fefefe
| 85252 ||  || — || September 16, 1993 || La Silla || H. Debehogne, E. W. Elst || FLO || align=right | 1.1 km || 
|-id=253 bgcolor=#fefefe
| 85253 ||  || — || October 8, 1993 || Kitt Peak || Spacewatch || — || align=right | 1.5 km || 
|-id=254 bgcolor=#fefefe
| 85254 ||  || — || October 14, 1993 || Palomar || H. E. Holt || — || align=right | 3.3 km || 
|-id=255 bgcolor=#d6d6d6
| 85255 ||  || — || October 9, 1993 || La Silla || E. W. Elst || — || align=right | 7.1 km || 
|-id=256 bgcolor=#d6d6d6
| 85256 ||  || — || October 9, 1993 || La Silla || E. W. Elst || THM || align=right | 3.9 km || 
|-id=257 bgcolor=#E9E9E9
| 85257 ||  || — || October 9, 1993 || La Silla || E. W. Elst || — || align=right | 2.9 km || 
|-id=258 bgcolor=#fefefe
| 85258 ||  || — || October 9, 1993 || La Silla || E. W. Elst || — || align=right | 1.6 km || 
|-id=259 bgcolor=#d6d6d6
| 85259 ||  || — || October 9, 1993 || La Silla || E. W. Elst || — || align=right | 4.8 km || 
|-id=260 bgcolor=#d6d6d6
| 85260 ||  || — || October 9, 1993 || La Silla || E. W. Elst || HYG || align=right | 5.9 km || 
|-id=261 bgcolor=#fefefe
| 85261 ||  || — || October 9, 1993 || La Silla || E. W. Elst || — || align=right | 1.5 km || 
|-id=262 bgcolor=#fefefe
| 85262 ||  || — || October 9, 1993 || La Silla || E. W. Elst || NYS || align=right | 1.8 km || 
|-id=263 bgcolor=#fefefe
| 85263 ||  || — || October 9, 1993 || La Silla || E. W. Elst || — || align=right | 1.8 km || 
|-id=264 bgcolor=#fefefe
| 85264 ||  || — || October 11, 1993 || La Silla || E. W. Elst || NYS || align=right | 1.4 km || 
|-id=265 bgcolor=#E9E9E9
| 85265 || 1993 VR || — || November 14, 1993 || Oizumi || T. Kobayashi || EUN || align=right | 3.0 km || 
|-id=266 bgcolor=#E9E9E9
| 85266 ||  || — || December 16, 1993 || Kitt Peak || Spacewatch || AST || align=right | 4.8 km || 
|-id=267 bgcolor=#E9E9E9
| 85267 Taj Mahal ||  ||  || January 12, 1994 || Colleverde || V. S. Casulli || HNS || align=right | 3.2 km || 
|-id=268 bgcolor=#d6d6d6
| 85268 ||  || — || January 5, 1994 || Kitt Peak || Spacewatch || THM || align=right | 5.2 km || 
|-id=269 bgcolor=#E9E9E9
| 85269 ||  || — || January 6, 1994 || Kitt Peak || Spacewatch || RAF || align=right | 3.0 km || 
|-id=270 bgcolor=#E9E9E9
| 85270 ||  || — || January 6, 1994 || Kitt Peak || Spacewatch || — || align=right | 1.6 km || 
|-id=271 bgcolor=#E9E9E9
| 85271 ||  || — || January 13, 1994 || Kitt Peak || Spacewatch || — || align=right | 1.7 km || 
|-id=272 bgcolor=#E9E9E9
| 85272 ||  || — || January 18, 1994 || Kitt Peak || Spacewatch || — || align=right | 4.6 km || 
|-id=273 bgcolor=#fefefe
| 85273 ||  || — || February 8, 1994 || La Silla || E. W. Elst || PHO || align=right | 2.3 km || 
|-id=274 bgcolor=#FA8072
| 85274 || 1994 GH || — || April 3, 1994 || Kitt Peak || Spacewatch || — || align=right | 1.1 km || 
|-id=275 bgcolor=#FFC2E0
| 85275 || 1994 LY || — || June 11, 1994 || Palomar || E. F. Helin || AMO +1kmmoon || align=right | 2.5 km || 
|-id=276 bgcolor=#d6d6d6
| 85276 ||  || — || August 10, 1994 || La Silla || E. W. Elst || HYG || align=right | 3.3 km || 
|-id=277 bgcolor=#fefefe
| 85277 ||  || — || August 10, 1994 || La Silla || E. W. Elst || V || align=right | 2.0 km || 
|-id=278 bgcolor=#fefefe
| 85278 ||  || — || August 10, 1994 || La Silla || E. W. Elst || — || align=right | 3.2 km || 
|-id=279 bgcolor=#fefefe
| 85279 ||  || — || August 10, 1994 || La Silla || E. W. Elst || — || align=right | 1.6 km || 
|-id=280 bgcolor=#d6d6d6
| 85280 ||  || — || August 10, 1994 || La Silla || E. W. Elst || — || align=right | 5.2 km || 
|-id=281 bgcolor=#fefefe
| 85281 ||  || — || August 10, 1994 || La Silla || E. W. Elst || FLO || align=right | 1.4 km || 
|-id=282 bgcolor=#d6d6d6
| 85282 ||  || — || August 12, 1994 || La Silla || E. W. Elst || HYG || align=right | 7.1 km || 
|-id=283 bgcolor=#d6d6d6
| 85283 ||  || — || August 12, 1994 || La Silla || E. W. Elst || THM || align=right | 5.7 km || 
|-id=284 bgcolor=#fefefe
| 85284 ||  || — || August 12, 1994 || La Silla || E. W. Elst || — || align=right | 1.8 km || 
|-id=285 bgcolor=#fefefe
| 85285 ||  || — || August 12, 1994 || La Silla || E. W. Elst || — || align=right | 1.3 km || 
|-id=286 bgcolor=#fefefe
| 85286 ||  || — || August 12, 1994 || La Silla || E. W. Elst || — || align=right | 2.2 km || 
|-id=287 bgcolor=#d6d6d6
| 85287 ||  || — || August 12, 1994 || La Silla || E. W. Elst || HYG || align=right | 5.7 km || 
|-id=288 bgcolor=#fefefe
| 85288 ||  || — || August 12, 1994 || La Silla || E. W. Elst || — || align=right | 1.8 km || 
|-id=289 bgcolor=#d6d6d6
| 85289 ||  || — || August 12, 1994 || La Silla || E. W. Elst || EOS || align=right | 4.0 km || 
|-id=290 bgcolor=#E9E9E9
| 85290 ||  || — || August 12, 1994 || La Silla || E. W. Elst || — || align=right | 4.6 km || 
|-id=291 bgcolor=#fefefe
| 85291 ||  || — || August 10, 1994 || La Silla || E. W. Elst || — || align=right | 1.8 km || 
|-id=292 bgcolor=#fefefe
| 85292 ||  || — || September 3, 1994 || La Silla || E. W. Elst || FLO || align=right | 2.2 km || 
|-id=293 bgcolor=#d6d6d6
| 85293 Tengzhou ||  ||  || September 12, 1994 || Xinglong || SCAP || — || align=right | 6.6 km || 
|-id=294 bgcolor=#fefefe
| 85294 ||  || — || September 28, 1994 || Kitt Peak || Spacewatch || NYS || align=right | 1.4 km || 
|-id=295 bgcolor=#E9E9E9
| 85295 || 1994 TY || — || October 2, 1994 || Kitami || K. Endate, K. Watanabe || MIT || align=right | 6.5 km || 
|-id=296 bgcolor=#fefefe
| 85296 ||  || — || October 6, 1994 || Kitt Peak || Spacewatch || — || align=right | 1.1 km || 
|-id=297 bgcolor=#fefefe
| 85297 ||  || — || October 6, 1994 || Kitt Peak || Spacewatch || — || align=right | 1.2 km || 
|-id=298 bgcolor=#fefefe
| 85298 ||  || — || October 8, 1994 || Kitt Peak || Spacewatch || — || align=right | 1.9 km || 
|-id=299 bgcolor=#fefefe
| 85299 Neander ||  ||  || October 5, 1994 || Tautenburg Observatory || F. Börngen || MAS || align=right | 1.7 km || 
|-id=300 bgcolor=#fefefe
| 85300 ||  || — || October 30, 1994 || Palomar || E. F. Helin || PHO || align=right | 3.4 km || 
|}

85301–85400 

|-bgcolor=#fefefe
| 85301 ||  || — || October 28, 1994 || Kitt Peak || Spacewatch || — || align=right | 2.8 km || 
|-id=302 bgcolor=#fefefe
| 85302 || 1994 VM || — || November 1, 1994 || Oizumi || T. Kobayashi || FLO || align=right | 1.7 km || 
|-id=303 bgcolor=#fefefe
| 85303 ||  || — || November 4, 1994 || Oizumi || T. Kobayashi || — || align=right | 1.8 km || 
|-id=304 bgcolor=#d6d6d6
| 85304 ||  || — || November 3, 1994 || Oizumi || T. Kobayashi || — || align=right | 6.4 km || 
|-id=305 bgcolor=#fefefe
| 85305 ||  || — || November 5, 1994 || Kitt Peak || Spacewatch || FLO || align=right | 1.7 km || 
|-id=306 bgcolor=#fefefe
| 85306 ||  || — || November 7, 1994 || Palomar || C. S. Shoemaker || H || align=right | 1.9 km || 
|-id=307 bgcolor=#fefefe
| 85307 || 1994 WN || — || November 25, 1994 || Oizumi || T. Kobayashi || — || align=right | 2.4 km || 
|-id=308 bgcolor=#fefefe
| 85308 Atsushimori ||  ||  || November 30, 1994 || Kuma Kogen || A. Nakamura || FLO || align=right | 1.3 km || 
|-id=309 bgcolor=#d6d6d6
| 85309 ||  || — || November 26, 1994 || Kitt Peak || Spacewatch || — || align=right | 2.9 km || 
|-id=310 bgcolor=#E9E9E9
| 85310 ||  || — || November 28, 1994 || Kitt Peak || Spacewatch || — || align=right | 1.7 km || 
|-id=311 bgcolor=#E9E9E9
| 85311 ||  || — || November 28, 1994 || Kitt Peak || Spacewatch || — || align=right | 3.7 km || 
|-id=312 bgcolor=#d6d6d6
| 85312 ||  || — || December 28, 1994 || Oizumi || T. Kobayashi || — || align=right | 10 km || 
|-id=313 bgcolor=#fefefe
| 85313 ||  || — || December 31, 1994 || Oizumi || T. Kobayashi || — || align=right | 2.8 km || 
|-id=314 bgcolor=#E9E9E9
| 85314 ||  || — || January 7, 1995 || Kitt Peak || Spacewatch || — || align=right | 3.1 km || 
|-id=315 bgcolor=#E9E9E9
| 85315 || 1995 BE || — || January 20, 1995 || Oizumi || T. Kobayashi || — || align=right | 2.1 km || 
|-id=316 bgcolor=#E9E9E9
| 85316 ||  || — || January 28, 1995 || Kitt Peak || S. M. Larson, C. W. Hergenrother || — || align=right | 2.4 km || 
|-id=317 bgcolor=#E9E9E9
| 85317 Lehár ||  ||  || January 30, 1995 || Tautenburg Observatory || F. Börngen || — || align=right | 3.1 km || 
|-id=318 bgcolor=#E9E9E9
| 85318 ||  || — || February 21, 1995 || Kitt Peak || Spacewatch || AER || align=right | 2.6 km || 
|-id=319 bgcolor=#d6d6d6
| 85319 ||  || — || March 2, 1995 || Kitt Peak || Spacewatch || — || align=right | 4.5 km || 
|-id=320 bgcolor=#E9E9E9
| 85320 Bertram ||  ||  || March 4, 1995 || Tautenburg Observatory || F. Börngen || — || align=right | 3.7 km || 
|-id=321 bgcolor=#E9E9E9
| 85321 ||  || — || March 25, 1995 || Kitt Peak || Spacewatch || — || align=right | 2.7 km || 
|-id=322 bgcolor=#E9E9E9
| 85322 ||  || — || April 6, 1995 || Kitt Peak || Spacewatch || — || align=right | 5.8 km || 
|-id=323 bgcolor=#d6d6d6
| 85323 ||  || — || April 8, 1995 || Kitt Peak || T. J. Balonek || HYG || align=right | 6.2 km || 
|-id=324 bgcolor=#d6d6d6
| 85324 ||  || — || April 25, 1995 || Kitt Peak || Spacewatch || — || align=right | 4.2 km || 
|-id=325 bgcolor=#d6d6d6
| 85325 ||  || — || June 22, 1995 || Kitt Peak || Spacewatch || — || align=right | 5.4 km || 
|-id=326 bgcolor=#d6d6d6
| 85326 ||  || — || July 24, 1995 || Kitt Peak || Spacewatch || — || align=right | 7.2 km || 
|-id=327 bgcolor=#d6d6d6
| 85327 ||  || — || July 26, 1995 || Kitt Peak || Spacewatch || URS || align=right | 4.2 km || 
|-id=328 bgcolor=#fefefe
| 85328 || 1995 PA || — || August 1, 1995 || Kleť || M. Tichý, Z. Moravec || NYS || align=right | 1.7 km || 
|-id=329 bgcolor=#E9E9E9
| 85329 || 1995 PQ || — || August 2, 1995 || Nachi-Katsuura || Y. Shimizu, T. Urata || — || align=right | 6.0 km || 
|-id=330 bgcolor=#E9E9E9
| 85330 || 1995 QO || — || August 23, 1995 || Ondřejov || L. Kotková || CLO || align=right | 2.1 km || 
|-id=331 bgcolor=#d6d6d6
| 85331 ||  || — || August 22, 1995 || Kitt Peak || Spacewatch || — || align=right | 5.8 km || 
|-id=332 bgcolor=#E9E9E9
| 85332 ||  || — || September 29, 1995 || Catalina Station || T. B. Spahr || — || align=right | 2.2 km || 
|-id=333 bgcolor=#d6d6d6
| 85333 ||  || — || September 18, 1995 || Kitt Peak || Spacewatch || — || align=right | 5.2 km || 
|-id=334 bgcolor=#fefefe
| 85334 ||  || — || September 18, 1995 || Kitt Peak || Spacewatch || — || align=right | 1.1 km || 
|-id=335 bgcolor=#E9E9E9
| 85335 ||  || — || September 18, 1995 || Kitt Peak || Spacewatch || PAD || align=right | 5.1 km || 
|-id=336 bgcolor=#d6d6d6
| 85336 ||  || — || September 19, 1995 || Kitt Peak || Spacewatch || — || align=right | 3.4 km || 
|-id=337 bgcolor=#E9E9E9
| 85337 ||  || — || September 22, 1995 || Kitt Peak || Spacewatch || — || align=right | 1.6 km || 
|-id=338 bgcolor=#E9E9E9
| 85338 ||  || — || September 24, 1995 || Kitt Peak || Spacewatch || fast? || align=right | 1.9 km || 
|-id=339 bgcolor=#d6d6d6
| 85339 ||  || — || September 24, 1995 || Kitt Peak || Spacewatch || — || align=right | 4.5 km || 
|-id=340 bgcolor=#d6d6d6
| 85340 ||  || — || September 25, 1995 || Kitt Peak || Spacewatch || THM || align=right | 5.1 km || 
|-id=341 bgcolor=#E9E9E9
| 85341 ||  || — || September 22, 1995 || Kitt Peak || Spacewatch || — || align=right | 5.5 km || 
|-id=342 bgcolor=#fefefe
| 85342 ||  || — || September 29, 1995 || Kitt Peak || Spacewatch || — || align=right | 1.3 km || 
|-id=343 bgcolor=#E9E9E9
| 85343 ||  || — || September 30, 1995 || Catalina Station || C. W. Hergenrother || GAL || align=right | 2.5 km || 
|-id=344 bgcolor=#E9E9E9
| 85344 ||  || — || September 26, 1995 || Kitt Peak || Spacewatch || AGN || align=right | 2.0 km || 
|-id=345 bgcolor=#E9E9E9
| 85345 ||  || — || September 25, 1995 || Kitt Peak || Spacewatch || — || align=right | 5.3 km || 
|-id=346 bgcolor=#d6d6d6
| 85346 ||  || — || September 19, 1995 || Kitt Peak || Spacewatch || — || align=right | 4.1 km || 
|-id=347 bgcolor=#fefefe
| 85347 ||  || — || September 23, 1995 || Kitt Peak || Spacewatch || V || align=right | 1.4 km || 
|-id=348 bgcolor=#E9E9E9
| 85348 ||  || — || September 23, 1995 || Kitt Peak || Spacewatch || — || align=right | 4.7 km || 
|-id=349 bgcolor=#E9E9E9
| 85349 ||  || — || October 17, 1995 || Kitt Peak || Spacewatch || — || align=right | 4.0 km || 
|-id=350 bgcolor=#d6d6d6
| 85350 ||  || — || October 17, 1995 || Kitt Peak || Spacewatch || KAR || align=right | 2.4 km || 
|-id=351 bgcolor=#d6d6d6
| 85351 ||  || — || October 18, 1995 || Kitt Peak || Spacewatch || — || align=right | 4.5 km || 
|-id=352 bgcolor=#fefefe
| 85352 ||  || — || October 25, 1995 || Kitt Peak || Spacewatch || — || align=right | 1.6 km || 
|-id=353 bgcolor=#fefefe
| 85353 ||  || — || October 20, 1995 || Caussols || E. W. Elst || — || align=right | 1.7 km || 
|-id=354 bgcolor=#fefefe
| 85354 ||  || — || October 17, 1995 || Kitt Peak || Spacewatch || — || align=right | 1.4 km || 
|-id=355 bgcolor=#E9E9E9
| 85355 ||  || — || November 15, 1995 || Kitt Peak || Spacewatch || — || align=right | 4.3 km || 
|-id=356 bgcolor=#E9E9E9
| 85356 ||  || — || November 20, 1995 || Farra d'Isonzo || Farra d'Isonzo || — || align=right | 2.3 km || 
|-id=357 bgcolor=#fefefe
| 85357 ||  || — || November 16, 1995 || Kitt Peak || Spacewatch || V || align=right | 1.4 km || 
|-id=358 bgcolor=#fefefe
| 85358 ||  || — || November 16, 1995 || Kitt Peak || Spacewatch || — || align=right | 1.8 km || 
|-id=359 bgcolor=#d6d6d6
| 85359 ||  || — || November 17, 1995 || Kitt Peak || Spacewatch || — || align=right | 4.6 km || 
|-id=360 bgcolor=#d6d6d6
| 85360 ||  || — || November 17, 1995 || Kitt Peak || Spacewatch || — || align=right | 6.1 km || 
|-id=361 bgcolor=#d6d6d6
| 85361 ||  || — || November 17, 1995 || Kitt Peak || Spacewatch || — || align=right | 4.4 km || 
|-id=362 bgcolor=#E9E9E9
| 85362 ||  || — || November 20, 1995 || Kitt Peak || Spacewatch || — || align=right | 2.4 km || 
|-id=363 bgcolor=#d6d6d6
| 85363 ||  || — || November 21, 1995 || Kitt Peak || Spacewatch || EOS || align=right | 4.3 km || 
|-id=364 bgcolor=#fefefe
| 85364 ||  || — || December 16, 1995 || Kitt Peak || Spacewatch || — || align=right | 1.4 km || 
|-id=365 bgcolor=#fefefe
| 85365 ||  || — || December 18, 1995 || Kitt Peak || Spacewatch || NYS || align=right | 1.3 km || 
|-id=366 bgcolor=#fefefe
| 85366 ||  || — || January 15, 1996 || Kitt Peak || Spacewatch || — || align=right | 1.5 km || 
|-id=367 bgcolor=#fefefe
| 85367 ||  || — || January 13, 1996 || Kitt Peak || Spacewatch || NYS || align=right | 1.2 km || 
|-id=368 bgcolor=#fefefe
| 85368 Elisabettacioni ||  ||  || February 14, 1996 || Cima Ekar || U. Munari, M. Tombelli || — || align=right | 2.3 km || 
|-id=369 bgcolor=#E9E9E9
| 85369 ||  || — || February 26, 1996 || Church Stretton || S. P. Laurie || — || align=right | 2.2 km || 
|-id=370 bgcolor=#fefefe
| 85370 ||  || — || March 11, 1996 || Kitt Peak || Spacewatch || MAS || align=right | 1.3 km || 
|-id=371 bgcolor=#fefefe
| 85371 ||  || — || March 12, 1996 || Kitt Peak || Spacewatch || — || align=right | 3.1 km || 
|-id=372 bgcolor=#FA8072
| 85372 ||  || — || March 13, 1996 || Kitt Peak || Spacewatch || — || align=right | 2.3 km || 
|-id=373 bgcolor=#fefefe
| 85373 ||  || — || March 19, 1996 || Haleakala || NEAT || FLO || align=right | 2.0 km || 
|-id=374 bgcolor=#d6d6d6
| 85374 ||  || — || March 22, 1996 || Haleakala || AMOS || — || align=right | 4.0 km || 
|-id=375 bgcolor=#E9E9E9
| 85375 ||  || — || April 11, 1996 || Kitt Peak || Spacewatch || — || align=right | 4.0 km || 
|-id=376 bgcolor=#fefefe
| 85376 ||  || — || April 12, 1996 || Kitt Peak || Spacewatch || — || align=right | 1.9 km || 
|-id=377 bgcolor=#fefefe
| 85377 ||  || — || April 15, 1996 || La Silla || E. W. Elst || — || align=right | 2.0 km || 
|-id=378 bgcolor=#fefefe
| 85378 ||  || — || April 15, 1996 || La Silla || E. W. Elst || — || align=right | 1.9 km || 
|-id=379 bgcolor=#fefefe
| 85379 ||  || — || April 20, 1996 || La Silla || E. W. Elst || NYS || align=right | 3.5 km || 
|-id=380 bgcolor=#fefefe
| 85380 || 1996 JS || — || May 13, 1996 || Haleakala || NEAT || — || align=right | 2.4 km || 
|-id=381 bgcolor=#E9E9E9
| 85381 ||  || — || May 13, 1996 || Kitt Peak || Spacewatch || — || align=right | 1.9 km || 
|-id=382 bgcolor=#fefefe
| 85382 ||  || — || June 8, 1996 || Kitt Peak || Spacewatch || — || align=right | 3.0 km || 
|-id=383 bgcolor=#FA8072
| 85383 || 1996 MS || — || June 22, 1996 || Haleakala || NEAT || — || align=right | 1.8 km || 
|-id=384 bgcolor=#E9E9E9
| 85384 || 1996 NZ || — || July 14, 1996 || Haleakala || NEAT || — || align=right | 3.2 km || 
|-id=385 bgcolor=#E9E9E9
| 85385 ||  || — || July 14, 1996 || La Silla || E. W. Elst || — || align=right | 4.2 km || 
|-id=386 bgcolor=#E9E9E9
| 85386 Payton ||  ||  || July 26, 1996 || Haleakala || AMOS || — || align=right | 4.8 km || 
|-id=387 bgcolor=#E9E9E9
| 85387 ||  || — || August 8, 1996 || La Silla || E. W. Elst || — || align=right | 4.7 km || 
|-id=388 bgcolor=#E9E9E9
| 85388 Sakazukiyama ||  ||  || August 11, 1996 || Nanyo || T. Okuni || — || align=right | 1.6 km || 
|-id=389 bgcolor=#E9E9E9
| 85389 Rosenauer ||  ||  || August 22, 1996 || Kleť || J. Tichá, M. Tichý || — || align=right | 2.8 km || 
|-id=390 bgcolor=#E9E9E9
| 85390 ||  || — || August 18, 1996 || Caussols || E. W. Elst || — || align=right | 4.9 km || 
|-id=391 bgcolor=#E9E9E9
| 85391 ||  || — || September 8, 1996 || Kitt Peak || Spacewatch || AGN || align=right | 2.3 km || 
|-id=392 bgcolor=#E9E9E9
| 85392 ||  || — || September 8, 1996 || Kitt Peak || Spacewatch || NEM || align=right | 5.1 km || 
|-id=393 bgcolor=#E9E9E9
| 85393 ||  || — || September 13, 1996 || Kitt Peak || Spacewatch || — || align=right | 3.0 km || 
|-id=394 bgcolor=#C2FFFF
| 85394 ||  || — || September 15, 1996 || La Silla || UDTS || L4 || align=right | 14 km || 
|-id=395 bgcolor=#E9E9E9
| 85395 ||  || — || September 20, 1996 || Xinglong || SCAP || BRU || align=right | 6.4 km || 
|-id=396 bgcolor=#E9E9E9
| 85396 ||  || — || September 21, 1996 || Xinglong || SCAP || — || align=right | 2.4 km || 
|-id=397 bgcolor=#E9E9E9
| 85397 ||  || — || October 6, 1996 || King City, Ontario Observatory || R. G. Sandness || EUN || align=right | 3.1 km || 
|-id=398 bgcolor=#E9E9E9
| 85398 ||  || — || October 5, 1996 || Xinglong || SCAP || — || align=right | 2.3 km || 
|-id=399 bgcolor=#E9E9E9
| 85399 ||  || — || October 8, 1996 || Haleakala || NEAT || — || align=right | 6.5 km || 
|-id=400 bgcolor=#E9E9E9
| 85400 Shiratakachu ||  ||  || October 8, 1996 || Nanyo || T. Okuni || — || align=right | 2.1 km || 
|}

85401–85500 

|-bgcolor=#E9E9E9
| 85401 Yamatenclub ||  ||  || October 9, 1996 || Nanyo || T. Okuni || — || align=right | 3.0 km || 
|-id=402 bgcolor=#E9E9E9
| 85402 ||  || — || October 4, 1996 || Kleť || Kleť Obs. || HEN || align=right | 2.6 km || 
|-id=403 bgcolor=#d6d6d6
| 85403 ||  || — || October 7, 1996 || Kitt Peak || Spacewatch || — || align=right | 5.1 km || 
|-id=404 bgcolor=#E9E9E9
| 85404 ||  || — || October 10, 1996 || Kitt Peak || Spacewatch || DOR || align=right | 6.3 km || 
|-id=405 bgcolor=#E9E9E9
| 85405 ||  || — || October 8, 1996 || La Silla || E. W. Elst || — || align=right | 2.8 km || 
|-id=406 bgcolor=#d6d6d6
| 85406 ||  || — || October 7, 1996 || Kitt Peak || Spacewatch || — || align=right | 5.2 km || 
|-id=407 bgcolor=#d6d6d6
| 85407 ||  || — || October 7, 1996 || Kitt Peak || Spacewatch || KOR || align=right | 2.3 km || 
|-id=408 bgcolor=#E9E9E9
| 85408 ||  || — || October 3, 1996 || Xinglong || SCAP || — || align=right | 3.0 km || 
|-id=409 bgcolor=#d6d6d6
| 85409 ||  || — || October 17, 1996 || Kitt Peak || Spacewatch || — || align=right | 3.7 km || 
|-id=410 bgcolor=#E9E9E9
| 85410 ||  || — || October 29, 1996 || Xinglong || SCAP || GAL || align=right | 2.7 km || 
|-id=411 bgcolor=#E9E9E9
| 85411 Paulflora ||  ||  || November 3, 1996 || Linz || E. Meyer, E. Obermair || — || align=right | 2.7 km || 
|-id=412 bgcolor=#E9E9E9
| 85412 ||  || — || November 4, 1996 || Kitt Peak || Spacewatch || — || align=right | 1.6 km || 
|-id=413 bgcolor=#d6d6d6
| 85413 ||  || — || November 4, 1996 || Kitt Peak || Spacewatch || EOS || align=right | 3.1 km || 
|-id=414 bgcolor=#d6d6d6
| 85414 ||  || — || November 6, 1996 || Kitt Peak || Spacewatch || KOR || align=right | 2.6 km || 
|-id=415 bgcolor=#E9E9E9
| 85415 ||  || — || November 3, 1996 || Kushiro || S. Ueda, H. Kaneda || — || align=right | 6.1 km || 
|-id=416 bgcolor=#E9E9E9
| 85416 ||  || — || December 4, 1996 || Kleť || Kleť Obs. || — || align=right | 2.1 km || 
|-id=417 bgcolor=#d6d6d6
| 85417 ||  || — || December 1, 1996 || Kitt Peak || Spacewatch || — || align=right | 3.1 km || 
|-id=418 bgcolor=#d6d6d6
| 85418 ||  || — || December 9, 1996 || Kitt Peak || Spacewatch || — || align=right | 5.9 km || 
|-id=419 bgcolor=#fefefe
| 85419 ||  || — || December 4, 1996 || Kitt Peak || Spacewatch || — || align=right | 2.4 km || 
|-id=420 bgcolor=#d6d6d6
| 85420 ||  || — || December 4, 1996 || Kitt Peak || Spacewatch || — || align=right | 6.9 km || 
|-id=421 bgcolor=#E9E9E9
| 85421 ||  || — || December 15, 1996 || Kitt Peak || Spacewatch || AEO || align=right | 4.1 km || 
|-id=422 bgcolor=#E9E9E9
| 85422 Maedanaoe ||  ||  || December 13, 1996 || Saji || Saji Obs. || JUN || align=right | 2.6 km || 
|-id=423 bgcolor=#d6d6d6
| 85423 ||  || — || December 14, 1996 || Kitt Peak || Spacewatch || LIX || align=right | 5.9 km || 
|-id=424 bgcolor=#d6d6d6
| 85424 ||  || — || January 4, 1997 || Oizumi || T. Kobayashi || TIR || align=right | 9.3 km || 
|-id=425 bgcolor=#fefefe
| 85425 ||  || — || January 3, 1997 || Kitt Peak || Spacewatch || — || align=right | 2.0 km || 
|-id=426 bgcolor=#fefefe
| 85426 ||  || — || January 10, 1997 || Prescott || P. G. Comba || — || align=right | 3.1 km || 
|-id=427 bgcolor=#fefefe
| 85427 ||  || — || January 11, 1997 || Oizumi || T. Kobayashi || — || align=right | 2.2 km || 
|-id=428 bgcolor=#d6d6d6
| 85428 ||  || — || January 14, 1997 || Kleť || Kleť Obs. || — || align=right | 6.3 km || 
|-id=429 bgcolor=#d6d6d6
| 85429 ||  || — || January 15, 1997 || Kleť || Kleť Obs. || — || align=right | 3.5 km || 
|-id=430 bgcolor=#fefefe
| 85430 ||  || — || January 31, 1997 || Prescott || P. G. Comba || — || align=right | 1.3 km || 
|-id=431 bgcolor=#d6d6d6
| 85431 ||  || — || January 31, 1997 || Kitt Peak || Spacewatch || — || align=right | 6.2 km || 
|-id=432 bgcolor=#E9E9E9
| 85432 ||  || — || February 4, 1997 || Xinglong || SCAP || — || align=right | 2.5 km || 
|-id=433 bgcolor=#fefefe
| 85433 ||  || — || February 13, 1997 || Sormano || M. Cavagna, A. Testa || NYS || align=right | 1.4 km || 
|-id=434 bgcolor=#d6d6d6
| 85434 ||  || — || February 9, 1997 || Kitt Peak || Spacewatch || — || align=right | 4.7 km || 
|-id=435 bgcolor=#fefefe
| 85435 ||  || — || March 2, 1997 || Kitt Peak || Spacewatch || — || align=right | 1.4 km || 
|-id=436 bgcolor=#d6d6d6
| 85436 ||  || — || March 5, 1997 || Kitt Peak || Spacewatch || — || align=right | 4.7 km || 
|-id=437 bgcolor=#fefefe
| 85437 ||  || — || March 11, 1997 || Kitt Peak || Spacewatch || — || align=right | 1.5 km || 
|-id=438 bgcolor=#fefefe
| 85438 ||  || — || March 5, 1997 || Socorro || LINEAR || FLO || align=right | 1.3 km || 
|-id=439 bgcolor=#fefefe
| 85439 ||  || — || March 13, 1997 || San Marcello || L. Tesi, G. Cattani || FLO || align=right | 1.3 km || 
|-id=440 bgcolor=#fefefe
| 85440 ||  || — || March 12, 1997 || La Silla || E. W. Elst || — || align=right | 1.7 km || 
|-id=441 bgcolor=#fefefe
| 85441 ||  || — || March 31, 1997 || Socorro || LINEAR || — || align=right | 1.3 km || 
|-id=442 bgcolor=#fefefe
| 85442 ||  || — || April 7, 1997 || Kitt Peak || Spacewatch || — || align=right | 2.6 km || 
|-id=443 bgcolor=#fefefe
| 85443 ||  || — || April 7, 1997 || Kitt Peak || Spacewatch || NYS || align=right | 1.1 km || 
|-id=444 bgcolor=#fefefe
| 85444 ||  || — || April 2, 1997 || Socorro || LINEAR || FLO || align=right | 2.3 km || 
|-id=445 bgcolor=#fefefe
| 85445 ||  || — || April 2, 1997 || Socorro || LINEAR || V || align=right | 1.7 km || 
|-id=446 bgcolor=#fefefe
| 85446 ||  || — || April 3, 1997 || Socorro || LINEAR || — || align=right | 1.9 km || 
|-id=447 bgcolor=#fefefe
| 85447 ||  || — || April 3, 1997 || Socorro || LINEAR || V || align=right | 1.6 km || 
|-id=448 bgcolor=#fefefe
| 85448 ||  || — || April 3, 1997 || Socorro || LINEAR || FLO || align=right | 2.3 km || 
|-id=449 bgcolor=#fefefe
| 85449 ||  || — || April 3, 1997 || Socorro || LINEAR || — || align=right | 1.9 km || 
|-id=450 bgcolor=#fefefe
| 85450 ||  || — || April 3, 1997 || Socorro || LINEAR || — || align=right | 1.9 km || 
|-id=451 bgcolor=#E9E9E9
| 85451 ||  || — || April 3, 1997 || Socorro || LINEAR || — || align=right | 2.1 km || 
|-id=452 bgcolor=#fefefe
| 85452 ||  || — || April 6, 1997 || Socorro || LINEAR || — || align=right | 1.7 km || 
|-id=453 bgcolor=#fefefe
| 85453 ||  || — || April 12, 1997 || Kitt Peak || Spacewatch || — || align=right | 2.0 km || 
|-id=454 bgcolor=#fefefe
| 85454 ||  || — || April 6, 1997 || Socorro || LINEAR || V || align=right | 1.3 km || 
|-id=455 bgcolor=#fefefe
| 85455 || 1997 HJ || — || April 28, 1997 || Kitt Peak || Spacewatch || — || align=right | 1.7 km || 
|-id=456 bgcolor=#fefefe
| 85456 || 1997 HW || — || April 28, 1997 || Kitt Peak || Spacewatch || — || align=right | 1.5 km || 
|-id=457 bgcolor=#fefefe
| 85457 ||  || — || April 29, 1997 || Kitt Peak || Spacewatch || V || align=right | 1.1 km || 
|-id=458 bgcolor=#d6d6d6
| 85458 ||  || — || April 30, 1997 || Socorro || LINEAR || HYG || align=right | 6.7 km || 
|-id=459 bgcolor=#fefefe
| 85459 ||  || — || April 30, 1997 || Socorro || LINEAR || — || align=right | 2.8 km || 
|-id=460 bgcolor=#fefefe
| 85460 ||  || — || April 30, 1997 || Socorro || LINEAR || V || align=right | 1.2 km || 
|-id=461 bgcolor=#fefefe
| 85461 ||  || — || April 30, 1997 || Socorro || LINEAR || — || align=right | 1.4 km || 
|-id=462 bgcolor=#fefefe
| 85462 ||  || — || April 30, 1997 || Socorro || LINEAR || V || align=right | 1.2 km || 
|-id=463 bgcolor=#d6d6d6
| 85463 ||  || — || May 1, 1997 || Caussols || ODAS || — || align=right | 6.0 km || 
|-id=464 bgcolor=#d6d6d6
| 85464 ||  || — || May 3, 1997 || Kitt Peak || Spacewatch || EOS || align=right | 4.2 km || 
|-id=465 bgcolor=#fefefe
| 85465 ||  || — || May 11, 1997 || Xinglong || SCAP || PHO || align=right | 2.8 km || 
|-id=466 bgcolor=#E9E9E9
| 85466 Krastins ||  ||  || May 3, 1997 || La Silla || E. W. Elst || NEM || align=right | 4.5 km || 
|-id=467 bgcolor=#fefefe
| 85467 ||  || — || May 31, 1997 || Kitt Peak || Spacewatch || — || align=right | 1.5 km || 
|-id=468 bgcolor=#fefefe
| 85468 ||  || — || June 1, 1997 || Kitt Peak || Spacewatch || — || align=right | 1.8 km || 
|-id=469 bgcolor=#E9E9E9
| 85469 ||  || — || June 5, 1997 || Kitt Peak || Spacewatch || — || align=right | 2.8 km || 
|-id=470 bgcolor=#d6d6d6
| 85470 ||  || — || June 5, 1997 || Kitt Peak || Spacewatch || — || align=right | 8.2 km || 
|-id=471 bgcolor=#fefefe
| 85471 Maryam ||  ||  || June 4, 1997 || Needville || Needville Obs. || — || align=right | 1.7 km || 
|-id=472 bgcolor=#fefefe
| 85472 Xizezong ||  ||  || June 9, 1997 || Xinglong || SCAP || — || align=right | 2.1 km || 
|-id=473 bgcolor=#fefefe
| 85473 ||  || — || June 12, 1997 || Cloudcroft || W. Offutt || MAS || align=right | 1.2 km || 
|-id=474 bgcolor=#fefefe
| 85474 ||  || — || June 8, 1997 || La Silla || E. W. Elst || — || align=right | 1.9 km || 
|-id=475 bgcolor=#fefefe
| 85475 ||  || — || June 8, 1997 || La Silla || E. W. Elst || — || align=right | 2.8 km || 
|-id=476 bgcolor=#fefefe
| 85476 || 1997 MY || — || June 26, 1997 || Xinglong || SCAP || — || align=right | 2.3 km || 
|-id=477 bgcolor=#fefefe
| 85477 ||  || — || June 28, 1997 || Socorro || LINEAR || MAS || align=right | 1.5 km || 
|-id=478 bgcolor=#fefefe
| 85478 ||  || — || June 29, 1997 || Socorro || LINEAR || MAS || align=right | 1.7 km || 
|-id=479 bgcolor=#fefefe
| 85479 ||  || — || July 9, 1997 || Ondřejov || L. Kotková || — || align=right | 1.8 km || 
|-id=480 bgcolor=#fefefe
| 85480 ||  || — || July 9, 1997 || Xinglong || SCAP || — || align=right | 1.8 km || 
|-id=481 bgcolor=#fefefe
| 85481 ||  || — || July 27, 1997 || Woomera || F. B. Zoltowski || PHO || align=right | 2.2 km || 
|-id=482 bgcolor=#fefefe
| 85482 ||  || — || August 7, 1997 || Rand || G. R. Viscome || NYS || align=right | 2.9 km || 
|-id=483 bgcolor=#E9E9E9
| 85483 ||  || — || August 30, 1997 || Haleakala || NEAT || PAL || align=right | 4.7 km || 
|-id=484 bgcolor=#fefefe
| 85484 ||  || — || August 30, 1997 || Ondřejov || P. Pravec, D. Tuma || FLO || align=right | 2.9 km || 
|-id=485 bgcolor=#fefefe
| 85485 ||  || — || September 4, 1997 || Caussols || ODAS || NYS || align=right | 4.5 km || 
|-id=486 bgcolor=#fefefe
| 85486 ||  || — || September 6, 1997 || Caussols || ODAS || NYS || align=right | 1.4 km || 
|-id=487 bgcolor=#fefefe
| 85487 ||  || — || September 19, 1997 || Xinglong || SCAP || NYS || align=right | 1.2 km || 
|-id=488 bgcolor=#fefefe
| 85488 ||  || — || September 23, 1997 || Prescott || P. G. Comba || NYS || align=right | 1.1 km || 
|-id=489 bgcolor=#d6d6d6
| 85489 ||  || — || September 19, 1997 || Xinglong || SCAP || — || align=right | 8.5 km || 
|-id=490 bgcolor=#FFC2E0
| 85490 ||  || — || September 28, 1997 || Haleakala || NEAT || AMO +1km || align=right | 4.1 km || 
|-id=491 bgcolor=#fefefe
| 85491 ||  || — || September 27, 1997 || Kitt Peak || Spacewatch || NYS || align=right | 2.6 km || 
|-id=492 bgcolor=#fefefe
| 85492 ||  || — || September 28, 1997 || Kitt Peak || Spacewatch || — || align=right | 1.7 km || 
|-id=493 bgcolor=#fefefe
| 85493 ||  || — || September 28, 1997 || Kitt Peak || Spacewatch || FLO || align=right | 1.4 km || 
|-id=494 bgcolor=#fefefe
| 85494 || 1997 TS || — || October 4, 1997 || Modra || A. Galád, A. Pravda || — || align=right | 1.6 km || 
|-id=495 bgcolor=#fefefe
| 85495 ||  || — || October 2, 1997 || Caussols || ODAS || NYS || align=right | 1.8 km || 
|-id=496 bgcolor=#E9E9E9
| 85496 ||  || — || October 2, 1997 || Caussols || ODAS || — || align=right | 5.0 km || 
|-id=497 bgcolor=#d6d6d6
| 85497 ||  || — || October 7, 1997 || Kitt Peak || Spacewatch || KOR || align=right | 2.7 km || 
|-id=498 bgcolor=#C2FFFF
| 85498 ||  || — || October 2, 1997 || Kitt Peak || Spacewatch || L4 || align=right | 12 km || 
|-id=499 bgcolor=#d6d6d6
| 85499 ||  || — || October 3, 1997 || Kitt Peak || Spacewatch || — || align=right | 3.7 km || 
|-id=500 bgcolor=#fefefe
| 85500 ||  || — || October 3, 1997 || Kitt Peak || Spacewatch || — || align=right | 2.0 km || 
|}

85501–85600 

|-bgcolor=#fefefe
| 85501 ||  || — || October 9, 1997 || Kitt Peak || Spacewatch || — || align=right | 4.3 km || 
|-id=502 bgcolor=#d6d6d6
| 85502 ||  || — || October 11, 1997 || Kitt Peak || Spacewatch || — || align=right | 5.3 km || 
|-id=503 bgcolor=#fefefe
| 85503 ||  || — || October 10, 1997 || Ondřejov || L. Kotková || — || align=right | 1.9 km || 
|-id=504 bgcolor=#fefefe
| 85504 ||  || — || October 11, 1997 || Xinglong || SCAP || — || align=right | 2.4 km || 
|-id=505 bgcolor=#fefefe
| 85505 ||  || — || October 26, 1997 || Oizumi || T. Kobayashi || — || align=right | 7.4 km || 
|-id=506 bgcolor=#fefefe
| 85506 ||  || — || October 19, 1997 || Xinglong || SCAP || — || align=right | 2.2 km || 
|-id=507 bgcolor=#E9E9E9
| 85507 ||  || — || October 21, 1997 || Xinglong || SCAP || EUN || align=right | 2.8 km || 
|-id=508 bgcolor=#fefefe
| 85508 ||  || — || October 23, 1997 || Kleť || Kleť Obs. || — || align=right | 2.0 km || 
|-id=509 bgcolor=#fefefe
| 85509 ||  || — || October 28, 1997 || Ondřejov || L. Kotková || NYS || align=right | 1.5 km || 
|-id=510 bgcolor=#fefefe
| 85510 ||  || — || October 29, 1997 || Kleť || Kleť Obs. || SVE || align=right | 4.6 km || 
|-id=511 bgcolor=#fefefe
| 85511 Celnik ||  ||  || October 30, 1997 || Solingen || B. Koch || MAS || align=right | 1.5 km || 
|-id=512 bgcolor=#fefefe
| 85512 Rieugnie ||  ||  || October 29, 1997 || Ramonville || C. Buil || — || align=right | 2.5 km || 
|-id=513 bgcolor=#fefefe
| 85513 ||  || — || October 31, 1997 || Oohira || T. Urata || NYS || align=right | 1.4 km || 
|-id=514 bgcolor=#fefefe
| 85514 ||  || — || October 23, 1997 || Kitt Peak || Spacewatch || NYS || align=right | 1.8 km || 
|-id=515 bgcolor=#fefefe
| 85515 Annakukharskaya ||  ||  || October 26, 1997 || Cima Ekar || U. Munari, M. Tombelli || — || align=right | 1.8 km || 
|-id=516 bgcolor=#fefefe
| 85516 Vaclík || 1997 VF ||  || November 2, 1997 || Kleť || J. Tichá, M. Tichý || ERI || align=right | 2.5 km || 
|-id=517 bgcolor=#fefefe
| 85517 ||  || — || November 1, 1997 || Oohira || T. Urata || FLO || align=right | 2.3 km || 
|-id=518 bgcolor=#E9E9E9
| 85518 ||  || — || November 6, 1997 || Oizumi || T. Kobayashi || — || align=right | 2.7 km || 
|-id=519 bgcolor=#E9E9E9
| 85519 ||  || — || November 3, 1997 || Xinglong || SCAP || GEF || align=right | 2.3 km || 
|-id=520 bgcolor=#fefefe
| 85520 ||  || — || November 23, 1997 || Oizumi || T. Kobayashi || FLO || align=right | 2.6 km || 
|-id=521 bgcolor=#fefefe
| 85521 ||  || — || November 23, 1997 || Oizumi || T. Kobayashi || NYS || align=right | 1.3 km || 
|-id=522 bgcolor=#fefefe
| 85522 ||  || — || November 20, 1997 || Kitt Peak || Spacewatch || NYS || align=right | 3.1 km || 
|-id=523 bgcolor=#E9E9E9
| 85523 ||  || — || November 23, 1997 || Kitt Peak || Spacewatch || — || align=right | 5.1 km || 
|-id=524 bgcolor=#E9E9E9
| 85524 ||  || — || November 21, 1997 || Kitt Peak || Spacewatch || — || align=right | 2.2 km || 
|-id=525 bgcolor=#E9E9E9
| 85525 ||  || — || November 21, 1997 || Kitt Peak || Spacewatch || — || align=right | 3.0 km || 
|-id=526 bgcolor=#fefefe
| 85526 ||  || — || November 22, 1997 || Kitt Peak || Spacewatch || FLO || align=right | 1.9 km || 
|-id=527 bgcolor=#d6d6d6
| 85527 ||  || — || November 22, 1997 || Kitt Peak || Spacewatch || KOR || align=right | 2.1 km || 
|-id=528 bgcolor=#d6d6d6
| 85528 ||  || — || November 23, 1997 || Kitt Peak || Spacewatch || — || align=right | 5.1 km || 
|-id=529 bgcolor=#fefefe
| 85529 ||  || — || November 23, 1997 || Kitt Peak || Spacewatch || V || align=right | 1.5 km || 
|-id=530 bgcolor=#fefefe
| 85530 ||  || — || November 23, 1997 || Kitt Peak || Spacewatch || NYS || align=right | 1.3 km || 
|-id=531 bgcolor=#E9E9E9
| 85531 ||  || — || November 23, 1997 || Kitt Peak || Spacewatch || — || align=right | 4.9 km || 
|-id=532 bgcolor=#E9E9E9
| 85532 ||  || — || November 23, 1997 || Nachi-Katsuura || Y. Shimizu, T. Urata || — || align=right | 3.9 km || 
|-id=533 bgcolor=#fefefe
| 85533 ||  || — || November 28, 1997 || Caussols || ODAS || — || align=right | 2.0 km || 
|-id=534 bgcolor=#fefefe
| 85534 ||  || — || November 23, 1997 || Kitt Peak || Spacewatch || MAS || align=right | 2.1 km || 
|-id=535 bgcolor=#fefefe
| 85535 ||  || — || November 29, 1997 || Kitt Peak || Spacewatch || NYS || align=right | 1.9 km || 
|-id=536 bgcolor=#fefefe
| 85536 ||  || — || November 29, 1997 || Socorro || LINEAR || NYS || align=right | 1.5 km || 
|-id=537 bgcolor=#E9E9E9
| 85537 ||  || — || November 29, 1997 || Socorro || LINEAR || — || align=right | 4.8 km || 
|-id=538 bgcolor=#E9E9E9
| 85538 ||  || — || November 29, 1997 || Socorro || LINEAR || MRX || align=right | 2.5 km || 
|-id=539 bgcolor=#E9E9E9
| 85539 ||  || — || November 29, 1997 || Socorro || LINEAR || — || align=right | 5.9 km || 
|-id=540 bgcolor=#E9E9E9
| 85540 ||  || — || November 29, 1997 || Socorro || LINEAR || — || align=right | 2.3 km || 
|-id=541 bgcolor=#fefefe
| 85541 ||  || — || November 29, 1997 || Socorro || LINEAR || NYS || align=right | 1.9 km || 
|-id=542 bgcolor=#E9E9E9
| 85542 ||  || — || November 29, 1997 || Socorro || LINEAR || — || align=right | 5.0 km || 
|-id=543 bgcolor=#E9E9E9
| 85543 ||  || — || November 26, 1997 || Socorro || LINEAR || — || align=right | 2.9 km || 
|-id=544 bgcolor=#E9E9E9
| 85544 ||  || — || November 28, 1997 || Xinglong || SCAP || — || align=right | 4.6 km || 
|-id=545 bgcolor=#d6d6d6
| 85545 ||  || — || November 29, 1997 || Socorro || LINEAR || — || align=right | 7.8 km || 
|-id=546 bgcolor=#FA8072
| 85546 ||  || — || December 3, 1997 || Oizumi || T. Kobayashi || — || align=right | 1.8 km || 
|-id=547 bgcolor=#fefefe
| 85547 ||  || — || December 5, 1997 || Cloudcroft || W. Offutt || — || align=right | 2.1 km || 
|-id=548 bgcolor=#fefefe
| 85548 ||  || — || December 4, 1997 || La Silla || UDTS || — || align=right | 2.0 km || 
|-id=549 bgcolor=#fefefe
| 85549 || 1997 YH || — || December 18, 1997 || Oizumi || T. Kobayashi || — || align=right | 2.5 km || 
|-id=550 bgcolor=#E9E9E9
| 85550 || 1997 YW || — || December 20, 1997 || Oizumi || T. Kobayashi || EUN || align=right | 5.0 km || 
|-id=551 bgcolor=#fefefe
| 85551 ||  || — || December 21, 1997 || Oizumi || T. Kobayashi || NYS || align=right | 1.9 km || 
|-id=552 bgcolor=#E9E9E9
| 85552 ||  || — || December 28, 1997 || Oizumi || T. Kobayashi || MAR || align=right | 3.3 km || 
|-id=553 bgcolor=#E9E9E9
| 85553 ||  || — || December 28, 1997 || Oizumi || T. Kobayashi || — || align=right | 4.6 km || 
|-id=554 bgcolor=#E9E9E9
| 85554 ||  || — || December 31, 1997 || Oizumi || T. Kobayashi || — || align=right | 2.1 km || 
|-id=555 bgcolor=#E9E9E9
| 85555 ||  || — || December 31, 1997 || Oizumi || T. Kobayashi || MAR || align=right | 3.7 km || 
|-id=556 bgcolor=#E9E9E9
| 85556 ||  || — || December 29, 1997 || Xinglong || SCAP || — || align=right | 2.5 km || 
|-id=557 bgcolor=#fefefe
| 85557 ||  || — || December 30, 1997 || Xinglong || SCAP || FLO || align=right | 2.2 km || 
|-id=558 bgcolor=#d6d6d6
| 85558 Tianjinshida ||  ||  || January 3, 1998 || Xinglong || SCAP || — || align=right | 7.9 km || 
|-id=559 bgcolor=#E9E9E9
| 85559 Villecroze ||  ||  || January 8, 1998 || NRC-DAO || S. Banh || — || align=right | 3.2 km || 
|-id=560 bgcolor=#d6d6d6
| 85560 || 1998 BN || — || January 18, 1998 || Oizumi || T. Kobayashi || EOS || align=right | 5.3 km || 
|-id=561 bgcolor=#E9E9E9
| 85561 ||  || — || January 20, 1998 || Socorro || LINEAR || — || align=right | 3.7 km || 
|-id=562 bgcolor=#fefefe
| 85562 ||  || — || January 18, 1998 || Kitt Peak || Spacewatch || — || align=right | 1.8 km || 
|-id=563 bgcolor=#fefefe
| 85563 ||  || — || January 24, 1998 || Haleakala || NEAT || H || align=right | 1.5 km || 
|-id=564 bgcolor=#E9E9E9
| 85564 Emilia ||  ||  || January 17, 1998 || Bologna || San Vittore Obs. || — || align=right | 3.0 km || 
|-id=565 bgcolor=#fefefe
| 85565 ||  || — || January 25, 1998 || Haleakala || NEAT || V || align=right | 1.6 km || 
|-id=566 bgcolor=#E9E9E9
| 85566 ||  || — || January 18, 1998 || Kitt Peak || Spacewatch || — || align=right | 2.6 km || 
|-id=567 bgcolor=#E9E9E9
| 85567 ||  || — || January 22, 1998 || Kitt Peak || Spacewatch || — || align=right | 3.6 km || 
|-id=568 bgcolor=#E9E9E9
| 85568 ||  || — || January 17, 1998 || Caussols || ODAS || — || align=right | 2.8 km || 
|-id=569 bgcolor=#d6d6d6
| 85569 ||  || — || January 22, 1998 || Kitt Peak || Spacewatch || KOR || align=right | 2.7 km || 
|-id=570 bgcolor=#E9E9E9
| 85570 ||  || — || January 22, 1998 || Kitt Peak || Spacewatch || — || align=right | 2.9 km || 
|-id=571 bgcolor=#d6d6d6
| 85571 ||  || — || January 23, 1998 || Kitt Peak || Spacewatch || — || align=right | 9.0 km || 
|-id=572 bgcolor=#d6d6d6
| 85572 ||  || — || January 25, 1998 || Kitt Peak || Spacewatch || — || align=right | 8.2 km || 
|-id=573 bgcolor=#d6d6d6
| 85573 || 1998 CE || — || February 1, 1998 || Kleť || J. Tichá, M. Tichý || KOR || align=right | 3.0 km || 
|-id=574 bgcolor=#d6d6d6
| 85574 || 1998 CG || — || February 1, 1998 || Kleť || J. Tichá, M. Tichý || 628 || align=right | 4.1 km || 
|-id=575 bgcolor=#d6d6d6
| 85575 ||  || — || February 19, 1998 || Modra || A. Galád, A. Pravda || — || align=right | 7.8 km || 
|-id=576 bgcolor=#d6d6d6
| 85576 ||  || — || February 19, 1998 || Kleť || Kleť Obs. || — || align=right | 5.7 km || 
|-id=577 bgcolor=#d6d6d6
| 85577 ||  || — || February 21, 1998 || Modra || A. Galád, A. Pravda || 3:2 || align=right | 11 km || 
|-id=578 bgcolor=#E9E9E9
| 85578 ||  || — || February 26, 1998 || Colleverde || V. S. Casulli || BAR || align=right | 2.5 km || 
|-id=579 bgcolor=#E9E9E9
| 85579 ||  || — || February 24, 1998 || Kitt Peak || Spacewatch || HEN || align=right | 1.9 km || 
|-id=580 bgcolor=#E9E9E9
| 85580 ||  || — || February 28, 1998 || Les Tardieux Obs. || M. Boeuf || — || align=right | 4.4 km || 
|-id=581 bgcolor=#E9E9E9
| 85581 ||  || — || February 22, 1998 || Kitt Peak || Spacewatch || EUN || align=right | 4.8 km || 
|-id=582 bgcolor=#E9E9E9
| 85582 ||  || — || February 23, 1998 || Kitt Peak || Spacewatch || — || align=right | 3.4 km || 
|-id=583 bgcolor=#E9E9E9
| 85583 ||  || — || March 1, 1998 || La Silla || E. W. Elst || CLO || align=right | 6.8 km || 
|-id=584 bgcolor=#d6d6d6
| 85584 ||  || — || March 3, 1998 || La Silla || E. W. Elst || — || align=right | 5.1 km || 
|-id=585 bgcolor=#FFC2E0
| 85585 Mjolnir ||  ||  || March 21, 1998 || Goodricke-Pigott || R. A. Tucker || APOPHAcritical || align=right data-sort-value="0.17" | 170 m || 
|-id=586 bgcolor=#E9E9E9
| 85586 ||  || — || March 21, 1998 || Kitt Peak || Spacewatch || EUN || align=right | 3.0 km || 
|-id=587 bgcolor=#d6d6d6
| 85587 ||  || — || March 25, 1998 || Haleakala || NEAT || — || align=right | 6.4 km || 
|-id=588 bgcolor=#E9E9E9
| 85588 ||  || — || March 25, 1998 || Stroncone || Santa Lucia Obs. || — || align=right | 4.1 km || 
|-id=589 bgcolor=#E9E9E9
| 85589 ||  || — || March 20, 1998 || Socorro || LINEAR || EUN || align=right | 4.4 km || 
|-id=590 bgcolor=#d6d6d6
| 85590 ||  || — || March 20, 1998 || Socorro || LINEAR || — || align=right | 4.8 km || 
|-id=591 bgcolor=#E9E9E9
| 85591 ||  || — || March 20, 1998 || Socorro || LINEAR || — || align=right | 4.7 km || 
|-id=592 bgcolor=#d6d6d6
| 85592 ||  || — || March 20, 1998 || Socorro || LINEAR || — || align=right | 6.6 km || 
|-id=593 bgcolor=#d6d6d6
| 85593 ||  || — || March 20, 1998 || Socorro || LINEAR || — || align=right | 5.8 km || 
|-id=594 bgcolor=#fefefe
| 85594 ||  || — || March 20, 1998 || Socorro || LINEAR || V || align=right | 1.6 km || 
|-id=595 bgcolor=#E9E9E9
| 85595 ||  || — || March 20, 1998 || Socorro || LINEAR || EUN || align=right | 5.7 km || 
|-id=596 bgcolor=#d6d6d6
| 85596 ||  || — || March 24, 1998 || Socorro || LINEAR || — || align=right | 6.3 km || 
|-id=597 bgcolor=#E9E9E9
| 85597 ||  || — || March 24, 1998 || Socorro || LINEAR || — || align=right | 5.8 km || 
|-id=598 bgcolor=#fefefe
| 85598 ||  || — || March 24, 1998 || Socorro || LINEAR || — || align=right | 3.9 km || 
|-id=599 bgcolor=#fefefe
| 85599 ||  || — || March 24, 1998 || Socorro || LINEAR || FLO || align=right | 1.5 km || 
|-id=600 bgcolor=#d6d6d6
| 85600 ||  || — || March 24, 1998 || Socorro || LINEAR || — || align=right | 7.5 km || 
|}

85601–85700 

|-bgcolor=#d6d6d6
| 85601 ||  || — || March 20, 1998 || Socorro || LINEAR || THM || align=right | 6.7 km || 
|-id=602 bgcolor=#fefefe
| 85602 ||  || — || March 20, 1998 || Socorro || LINEAR || — || align=right | 2.2 km || 
|-id=603 bgcolor=#E9E9E9
| 85603 ||  || — || March 20, 1998 || Socorro || LINEAR || ADE || align=right | 4.1 km || 
|-id=604 bgcolor=#d6d6d6
| 85604 ||  || — || March 31, 1998 || Socorro || LINEAR || BRA || align=right | 2.9 km || 
|-id=605 bgcolor=#d6d6d6
| 85605 ||  || — || March 20, 1998 || Socorro || LINEAR || — || align=right | 8.6 km || 
|-id=606 bgcolor=#d6d6d6
| 85606 ||  || — || March 28, 1998 || Socorro || LINEAR || THM || align=right | 4.9 km || 
|-id=607 bgcolor=#d6d6d6
| 85607 ||  || — || March 25, 1998 || Kitt Peak || Spacewatch || HYG || align=right | 5.6 km || 
|-id=608 bgcolor=#d6d6d6
| 85608 ||  || — || April 2, 1998 || Socorro || LINEAR || — || align=right | 6.7 km || 
|-id=609 bgcolor=#fefefe
| 85609 ||  || — || April 17, 1998 || Kitt Peak || Spacewatch || FLO || align=right | 1.6 km || 
|-id=610 bgcolor=#d6d6d6
| 85610 ||  || — || April 17, 1998 || Kitt Peak || Spacewatch || HYG || align=right | 5.7 km || 
|-id=611 bgcolor=#fefefe
| 85611 ||  || — || April 26, 1998 || Kitt Peak || Spacewatch || — || align=right | 2.2 km || 
|-id=612 bgcolor=#E9E9E9
| 85612 ||  || — || April 20, 1998 || Socorro || LINEAR || ADE || align=right | 4.0 km || 
|-id=613 bgcolor=#d6d6d6
| 85613 ||  || — || April 20, 1998 || Socorro || LINEAR || — || align=right | 7.4 km || 
|-id=614 bgcolor=#d6d6d6
| 85614 ||  || — || April 20, 1998 || Socorro || LINEAR || — || align=right | 7.0 km || 
|-id=615 bgcolor=#fefefe
| 85615 ||  || — || April 20, 1998 || Socorro || LINEAR || — || align=right | 2.2 km || 
|-id=616 bgcolor=#d6d6d6
| 85616 ||  || — || April 24, 1998 || Kitt Peak || Spacewatch || — || align=right | 4.7 km || 
|-id=617 bgcolor=#fefefe
| 85617 ||  || — || April 21, 1998 || Socorro || LINEAR || MAS || align=right | 1.7 km || 
|-id=618 bgcolor=#E9E9E9
| 85618 ||  || — || April 25, 1998 || La Silla || E. W. Elst || — || align=right | 2.5 km || 
|-id=619 bgcolor=#E9E9E9
| 85619 ||  || — || April 23, 1998 || Socorro || LINEAR || MIT || align=right | 4.0 km || 
|-id=620 bgcolor=#d6d6d6
| 85620 ||  || — || April 23, 1998 || Socorro || LINEAR || HYG || align=right | 7.7 km || 
|-id=621 bgcolor=#E9E9E9
| 85621 ||  || — || April 23, 1998 || Socorro || LINEAR || — || align=right | 1.9 km || 
|-id=622 bgcolor=#fefefe
| 85622 ||  || — || April 23, 1998 || Socorro || LINEAR || — || align=right | 1.8 km || 
|-id=623 bgcolor=#d6d6d6
| 85623 ||  || — || April 23, 1998 || Socorro || LINEAR || — || align=right | 4.9 km || 
|-id=624 bgcolor=#fefefe
| 85624 ||  || — || April 21, 1998 || Socorro || LINEAR || — || align=right | 1.9 km || 
|-id=625 bgcolor=#d6d6d6
| 85625 ||  || — || April 21, 1998 || Socorro || LINEAR || — || align=right | 6.6 km || 
|-id=626 bgcolor=#fefefe
| 85626 ||  || — || April 21, 1998 || Socorro || LINEAR || CIM || align=right | 6.3 km || 
|-id=627 bgcolor=#C2E0FF
| 85627 ||  || — || April 28, 1998 || Mauna Kea || Mauna Kea Obs. || cubewano (cold)critical || align=right | 147 km || 
|-id=628 bgcolor=#FFC2E0
| 85628 ||  || — || May 22, 1998 || Socorro || LINEAR || AMO +1kmmoon || align=right data-sort-value="0.78" | 780 m || 
|-id=629 bgcolor=#d6d6d6
| 85629 ||  || — || May 24, 1998 || Kitt Peak || Spacewatch || — || align=right | 6.2 km || 
|-id=630 bgcolor=#E9E9E9
| 85630 ||  || — || May 22, 1998 || Socorro || LINEAR || — || align=right | 2.6 km || 
|-id=631 bgcolor=#E9E9E9
| 85631 ||  || — || May 23, 1998 || Socorro || LINEAR || INO || align=right | 2.9 km || 
|-id=632 bgcolor=#d6d6d6
| 85632 ||  || — || May 23, 1998 || Socorro || LINEAR || — || align=right | 8.4 km || 
|-id=633 bgcolor=#C2E0FF
| 85633 ||  || — || May 29, 1998 || Cerro Tololo || G. Bernstein || cubewano (cold) || align=right | 203 km || 
|-id=634 bgcolor=#fefefe
| 85634 ||  || — || June 1, 1998 || La Silla || E. W. Elst || FLO || align=right | 1.3 km || 
|-id=635 bgcolor=#d6d6d6
| 85635 ||  || — || June 20, 1998 || Kitt Peak || Spacewatch || — || align=right | 4.0 km || 
|-id=636 bgcolor=#d6d6d6
| 85636 ||  || — || June 19, 1998 || Kitt Peak || Spacewatch || — || align=right | 8.5 km || 
|-id=637 bgcolor=#d6d6d6
| 85637 ||  || — || June 19, 1998 || Socorro || LINEAR || — || align=right | 6.2 km || 
|-id=638 bgcolor=#d6d6d6
| 85638 ||  || — || June 24, 1998 || Socorro || LINEAR || ALA || align=right | 8.8 km || 
|-id=639 bgcolor=#fefefe
| 85639 || 1998 OU || — || July 20, 1998 || Caussols || ODAS || — || align=right | 1.5 km || 
|-id=640 bgcolor=#FFC2E0
| 85640 ||  || — || July 26, 1998 || Kitt Peak || Spacewatch || APOPHAcritical || align=right data-sort-value="0.21" | 210 m || 
|-id=641 bgcolor=#E9E9E9
| 85641 ||  || — || July 29, 1998 || Caussols || ODAS || MARfast? || align=right | 1.8 km || 
|-id=642 bgcolor=#fefefe
| 85642 ||  || — || July 26, 1998 || La Silla || E. W. Elst || FLO || align=right | 1.8 km || 
|-id=643 bgcolor=#d6d6d6
| 85643 ||  || — || July 26, 1998 || La Silla || E. W. Elst || — || align=right | 8.7 km || 
|-id=644 bgcolor=#fefefe
| 85644 ||  || — || July 26, 1998 || La Silla || E. W. Elst || — || align=right | 3.0 km || 
|-id=645 bgcolor=#E9E9E9
| 85645 ||  || — || July 26, 1998 || La Silla || E. W. Elst || — || align=right | 6.3 km || 
|-id=646 bgcolor=#fefefe
| 85646 ||  || — || July 26, 1998 || La Silla || E. W. Elst || FLO || align=right | 2.3 km || 
|-id=647 bgcolor=#fefefe
| 85647 || 1998 PZ || — || August 14, 1998 || Woomera || F. B. Zoltowski || — || align=right | 2.0 km || 
|-id=648 bgcolor=#d6d6d6
| 85648 ||  || — || August 11, 1998 || Mallorca || Á. López J. || — || align=right | 7.2 km || 
|-id=649 bgcolor=#fefefe
| 85649 ||  || — || August 19, 1998 || Haleakala || NEAT || — || align=right | 1.7 km || 
|-id=650 bgcolor=#d6d6d6
| 85650 ||  || — || August 24, 1998 || Caussols || ODAS || — || align=right | 6.7 km || 
|-id=651 bgcolor=#fefefe
| 85651 ||  || — || August 17, 1998 || Socorro || LINEAR || — || align=right | 4.7 km || 
|-id=652 bgcolor=#d6d6d6
| 85652 ||  || — || August 17, 1998 || Socorro || LINEAR || TIR || align=right | 8.0 km || 
|-id=653 bgcolor=#fefefe
| 85653 ||  || — || August 17, 1998 || Socorro || LINEAR || — || align=right | 2.1 km || 
|-id=654 bgcolor=#d6d6d6
| 85654 ||  || — || August 17, 1998 || Socorro || LINEAR || — || align=right | 7.5 km || 
|-id=655 bgcolor=#fefefe
| 85655 ||  || — || August 17, 1998 || Socorro || LINEAR || FLO || align=right | 1.6 km || 
|-id=656 bgcolor=#fefefe
| 85656 ||  || — || August 17, 1998 || Socorro || LINEAR || — || align=right | 1.8 km || 
|-id=657 bgcolor=#fefefe
| 85657 ||  || — || August 17, 1998 || Socorro || LINEAR || — || align=right | 1.6 km || 
|-id=658 bgcolor=#E9E9E9
| 85658 ||  || — || August 22, 1998 || Xinglong || SCAP || — || align=right | 3.9 km || 
|-id=659 bgcolor=#fefefe
| 85659 ||  || — || August 23, 1998 || Xinglong || SCAP || — || align=right | 1.6 km || 
|-id=660 bgcolor=#d6d6d6
| 85660 ||  || — || August 17, 1998 || Socorro || LINEAR || — || align=right | 9.8 km || 
|-id=661 bgcolor=#fefefe
| 85661 ||  || — || August 17, 1998 || Socorro || LINEAR || — || align=right | 2.4 km || 
|-id=662 bgcolor=#E9E9E9
| 85662 ||  || — || August 17, 1998 || Socorro || LINEAR || JUN || align=right | 2.8 km || 
|-id=663 bgcolor=#fefefe
| 85663 ||  || — || August 17, 1998 || Socorro || LINEAR || FLO || align=right | 1.5 km || 
|-id=664 bgcolor=#fefefe
| 85664 ||  || — || August 17, 1998 || Socorro || LINEAR || — || align=right | 1.8 km || 
|-id=665 bgcolor=#d6d6d6
| 85665 ||  || — || August 17, 1998 || Socorro || LINEAR || THM || align=right | 6.8 km || 
|-id=666 bgcolor=#fefefe
| 85666 ||  || — || August 17, 1998 || Socorro || LINEAR || — || align=right | 2.2 km || 
|-id=667 bgcolor=#d6d6d6
| 85667 ||  || — || August 20, 1998 || Anderson Mesa || LONEOS || — || align=right | 7.1 km || 
|-id=668 bgcolor=#E9E9E9
| 85668 ||  || — || August 20, 1998 || Anderson Mesa || LONEOS || — || align=right | 3.2 km || 
|-id=669 bgcolor=#fefefe
| 85669 ||  || — || August 26, 1998 || Caussols || ODAS || — || align=right | 1.4 km || 
|-id=670 bgcolor=#fefefe
| 85670 ||  || — || August 30, 1998 || Kitt Peak || Spacewatch || — || align=right | 1.1 km || 
|-id=671 bgcolor=#d6d6d6
| 85671 ||  || — || August 24, 1998 || Socorro || LINEAR || EUP || align=right | 9.6 km || 
|-id=672 bgcolor=#d6d6d6
| 85672 ||  || — || August 19, 1998 || Socorro || LINEAR || EUP || align=right | 7.7 km || 
|-id=673 bgcolor=#fefefe
| 85673 ||  || — || August 26, 1998 || La Silla || E. W. Elst || FLO || align=right | 2.3 km || 
|-id=674 bgcolor=#fefefe
| 85674 ||  || — || August 26, 1998 || La Silla || E. W. Elst || — || align=right | 1.9 km || 
|-id=675 bgcolor=#d6d6d6
| 85675 ||  || — || September 3, 1998 || Woomera || F. B. Zoltowski || — || align=right | 9.1 km || 
|-id=676 bgcolor=#fefefe
| 85676 ||  || — || September 13, 1998 || Kitt Peak || Spacewatch || MAS || align=right | 1.4 km || 
|-id=677 bgcolor=#fefefe
| 85677 ||  || — || September 13, 1998 || Kitt Peak || Spacewatch || MAS || align=right | 1.3 km || 
|-id=678 bgcolor=#fefefe
| 85678 ||  || — || September 12, 1998 || Kitt Peak || Spacewatch || — || align=right | 4.4 km || 
|-id=679 bgcolor=#d6d6d6
| 85679 ||  || — || September 15, 1998 || Kitt Peak || Spacewatch || — || align=right | 5.5 km || 
|-id=680 bgcolor=#d6d6d6
| 85680 ||  || — || September 15, 1998 || Kitt Peak || Spacewatch || — || align=right | 5.6 km || 
|-id=681 bgcolor=#fefefe
| 85681 ||  || — || September 14, 1998 || Socorro || LINEAR || — || align=right | 2.9 km || 
|-id=682 bgcolor=#fefefe
| 85682 ||  || — || September 14, 1998 || Socorro || LINEAR || — || align=right | 1.7 km || 
|-id=683 bgcolor=#fefefe
| 85683 ||  || — || September 14, 1998 || Socorro || LINEAR || NYS || align=right | 1.4 km || 
|-id=684 bgcolor=#fefefe
| 85684 ||  || — || September 14, 1998 || Socorro || LINEAR || FLO || align=right | 1.5 km || 
|-id=685 bgcolor=#fefefe
| 85685 ||  || — || September 14, 1998 || Socorro || LINEAR || — || align=right | 1.9 km || 
|-id=686 bgcolor=#E9E9E9
| 85686 ||  || — || September 14, 1998 || Socorro || LINEAR || — || align=right | 1.6 km || 
|-id=687 bgcolor=#fefefe
| 85687 ||  || — || September 14, 1998 || Socorro || LINEAR || V || align=right | 1.7 km || 
|-id=688 bgcolor=#fefefe
| 85688 ||  || — || September 14, 1998 || Socorro || LINEAR || — || align=right | 1.8 km || 
|-id=689 bgcolor=#E9E9E9
| 85689 ||  || — || September 14, 1998 || Socorro || LINEAR || HOF || align=right | 6.6 km || 
|-id=690 bgcolor=#fefefe
| 85690 ||  || — || September 14, 1998 || Socorro || LINEAR || — || align=right | 1.2 km || 
|-id=691 bgcolor=#E9E9E9
| 85691 ||  || — || September 14, 1998 || Socorro || LINEAR || — || align=right | 3.0 km || 
|-id=692 bgcolor=#E9E9E9
| 85692 ||  || — || September 14, 1998 || Socorro || LINEAR || — || align=right | 3.1 km || 
|-id=693 bgcolor=#fefefe
| 85693 ||  || — || September 14, 1998 || Socorro || LINEAR || FLO || align=right | 1.8 km || 
|-id=694 bgcolor=#E9E9E9
| 85694 ||  || — || September 14, 1998 || Socorro || LINEAR || — || align=right | 6.8 km || 
|-id=695 bgcolor=#fefefe
| 85695 ||  || — || September 14, 1998 || Socorro || LINEAR || — || align=right | 1.5 km || 
|-id=696 bgcolor=#fefefe
| 85696 ||  || — || September 14, 1998 || Socorro || LINEAR || FLO || align=right | 1.7 km || 
|-id=697 bgcolor=#fefefe
| 85697 ||  || — || September 14, 1998 || Socorro || LINEAR || FLO || align=right | 1.6 km || 
|-id=698 bgcolor=#fefefe
| 85698 ||  || — || September 14, 1998 || Socorro || LINEAR || — || align=right | 2.1 km || 
|-id=699 bgcolor=#fefefe
| 85699 ||  || — || September 14, 1998 || Socorro || LINEAR || NYS || align=right | 1.3 km || 
|-id=700 bgcolor=#E9E9E9
| 85700 ||  || — || September 14, 1998 || Socorro || LINEAR || — || align=right | 5.5 km || 
|}

85701–85800 

|-bgcolor=#E9E9E9
| 85701 ||  || — || September 14, 1998 || Socorro || LINEAR || — || align=right | 3.3 km || 
|-id=702 bgcolor=#fefefe
| 85702 ||  || — || September 14, 1998 || Socorro || LINEAR || — || align=right | 1.9 km || 
|-id=703 bgcolor=#d6d6d6
| 85703 ||  || — || September 14, 1998 || Socorro || LINEAR || — || align=right | 6.3 km || 
|-id=704 bgcolor=#E9E9E9
| 85704 ||  || — || September 20, 1998 || Kitt Peak || Spacewatch || — || align=right | 1.4 km || 
|-id=705 bgcolor=#fefefe
| 85705 ||  || — || September 21, 1998 || Kitt Peak || Spacewatch || — || align=right | 4.3 km || 
|-id=706 bgcolor=#fefefe
| 85706 ||  || — || September 20, 1998 || Xinglong || SCAP || — || align=right | 1.5 km || 
|-id=707 bgcolor=#fefefe
| 85707 ||  || — || September 26, 1998 || Socorro || LINEAR || — || align=right | 2.5 km || 
|-id=708 bgcolor=#fefefe
| 85708 ||  || — || September 27, 1998 || Baton Rouge || W. R. Cooney Jr., K. Wefel || FLO || align=right | 2.4 km || 
|-id=709 bgcolor=#FFC2E0
| 85709 ||  || — || September 26, 1998 || Socorro || LINEAR || AMO +1km || align=right | 2.2 km || 
|-id=710 bgcolor=#E9E9E9
| 85710 ||  || — || September 23, 1998 || Kitt Peak || Spacewatch || ADE || align=right | 3.5 km || 
|-id=711 bgcolor=#fefefe
| 85711 ||  || — || September 25, 1998 || Xinglong || SCAP || — || align=right | 2.0 km || 
|-id=712 bgcolor=#fefefe
| 85712 ||  || — || September 25, 1998 || Kitt Peak || Spacewatch || — || align=right | 1.5 km || 
|-id=713 bgcolor=#FFC2E0
| 85713 ||  || — || September 29, 1998 || Socorro || LINEAR || APO +1kmPHA || align=right | 3.5 km || 
|-id=714 bgcolor=#E9E9E9
| 85714 ||  || — || September 26, 1998 || Socorro || LINEAR || BRU || align=right | 5.5 km || 
|-id=715 bgcolor=#fefefe
| 85715 ||  || — || September 16, 1998 || Anderson Mesa || LONEOS || FLO || align=right | 1.7 km || 
|-id=716 bgcolor=#d6d6d6
| 85716 ||  || — || September 16, 1998 || Anderson Mesa || LONEOS || — || align=right | 19 km || 
|-id=717 bgcolor=#fefefe
| 85717 ||  || — || September 17, 1998 || Anderson Mesa || LONEOS || — || align=right | 1.9 km || 
|-id=718 bgcolor=#fefefe
| 85718 ||  || — || September 17, 1998 || Anderson Mesa || LONEOS || V || align=right | 1.5 km || 
|-id=719 bgcolor=#E9E9E9
| 85719 ||  || — || September 17, 1998 || Anderson Mesa || LONEOS || MIS || align=right | 5.4 km || 
|-id=720 bgcolor=#E9E9E9
| 85720 ||  || — || September 17, 1998 || Anderson Mesa || LONEOS || — || align=right | 2.8 km || 
|-id=721 bgcolor=#fefefe
| 85721 ||  || — || September 29, 1998 || Xinglong || SCAP || — || align=right | 2.0 km || 
|-id=722 bgcolor=#d6d6d6
| 85722 ||  || — || September 20, 1998 || La Silla || E. W. Elst || — || align=right | 5.0 km || 
|-id=723 bgcolor=#fefefe
| 85723 ||  || — || September 20, 1998 || La Silla || E. W. Elst || — || align=right | 1.9 km || 
|-id=724 bgcolor=#E9E9E9
| 85724 ||  || — || September 19, 1998 || Socorro || LINEAR || — || align=right | 2.1 km || 
|-id=725 bgcolor=#fefefe
| 85725 ||  || — || September 19, 1998 || Socorro || LINEAR || V || align=right | 1.5 km || 
|-id=726 bgcolor=#fefefe
| 85726 ||  || — || September 26, 1998 || Socorro || LINEAR || — || align=right | 1.4 km || 
|-id=727 bgcolor=#fefefe
| 85727 ||  || — || September 21, 1998 || La Silla || E. W. Elst || ERI || align=right | 3.7 km || 
|-id=728 bgcolor=#fefefe
| 85728 ||  || — || September 17, 1998 || Xinglong || SCAP || — || align=right data-sort-value="0.80" | 800 m || 
|-id=729 bgcolor=#E9E9E9
| 85729 ||  || — || September 26, 1998 || Socorro || LINEAR || — || align=right | 4.9 km || 
|-id=730 bgcolor=#fefefe
| 85730 ||  || — || September 26, 1998 || Socorro || LINEAR || — || align=right | 1.8 km || 
|-id=731 bgcolor=#fefefe
| 85731 ||  || — || September 26, 1998 || Socorro || LINEAR || FLO || align=right | 2.7 km || 
|-id=732 bgcolor=#d6d6d6
| 85732 ||  || — || September 26, 1998 || Socorro || LINEAR || — || align=right | 6.4 km || 
|-id=733 bgcolor=#E9E9E9
| 85733 ||  || — || September 26, 1998 || Socorro || LINEAR || — || align=right | 3.0 km || 
|-id=734 bgcolor=#fefefe
| 85734 ||  || — || September 26, 1998 || Socorro || LINEAR || FLO || align=right | 1.7 km || 
|-id=735 bgcolor=#fefefe
| 85735 ||  || — || September 26, 1998 || Socorro || LINEAR || FLO || align=right | 2.0 km || 
|-id=736 bgcolor=#E9E9E9
| 85736 ||  || — || September 26, 1998 || Socorro || LINEAR || — || align=right | 6.2 km || 
|-id=737 bgcolor=#fefefe
| 85737 ||  || — || September 26, 1998 || Socorro || LINEAR || V || align=right | 1.2 km || 
|-id=738 bgcolor=#fefefe
| 85738 ||  || — || September 26, 1998 || Socorro || LINEAR || — || align=right | 1.9 km || 
|-id=739 bgcolor=#fefefe
| 85739 ||  || — || September 26, 1998 || Socorro || LINEAR || NYS || align=right | 3.4 km || 
|-id=740 bgcolor=#fefefe
| 85740 ||  || — || September 26, 1998 || Socorro || LINEAR || FLO || align=right | 1.4 km || 
|-id=741 bgcolor=#fefefe
| 85741 ||  || — || September 26, 1998 || Socorro || LINEAR || — || align=right | 2.1 km || 
|-id=742 bgcolor=#fefefe
| 85742 ||  || — || September 26, 1998 || Socorro || LINEAR || V || align=right | 1.6 km || 
|-id=743 bgcolor=#fefefe
| 85743 ||  || — || September 26, 1998 || Socorro || LINEAR || — || align=right | 1.8 km || 
|-id=744 bgcolor=#fefefe
| 85744 ||  || — || September 26, 1998 || Socorro || LINEAR || — || align=right | 2.1 km || 
|-id=745 bgcolor=#E9E9E9
| 85745 ||  || — || September 26, 1998 || Socorro || LINEAR || — || align=right | 5.3 km || 
|-id=746 bgcolor=#fefefe
| 85746 ||  || — || September 26, 1998 || Socorro || LINEAR || V || align=right | 1.5 km || 
|-id=747 bgcolor=#fefefe
| 85747 ||  || — || September 26, 1998 || Socorro || LINEAR || FLO || align=right | 2.6 km || 
|-id=748 bgcolor=#fefefe
| 85748 ||  || — || September 26, 1998 || Socorro || LINEAR || NYS || align=right | 1.7 km || 
|-id=749 bgcolor=#E9E9E9
| 85749 ||  || — || September 26, 1998 || Socorro || LINEAR || — || align=right | 1.9 km || 
|-id=750 bgcolor=#E9E9E9
| 85750 ||  || — || September 26, 1998 || Socorro || LINEAR || EUN || align=right | 2.5 km || 
|-id=751 bgcolor=#fefefe
| 85751 ||  || — || September 20, 1998 || La Silla || E. W. Elst || — || align=right | 1.6 km || 
|-id=752 bgcolor=#fefefe
| 85752 ||  || — || September 26, 1998 || Socorro || LINEAR || NYS || align=right | 1.7 km || 
|-id=753 bgcolor=#fefefe
| 85753 ||  || — || September 26, 1998 || Socorro || LINEAR || — || align=right | 1.7 km || 
|-id=754 bgcolor=#d6d6d6
| 85754 ||  || — || September 26, 1998 || Socorro || LINEAR || — || align=right | 6.8 km || 
|-id=755 bgcolor=#E9E9E9
| 85755 ||  || — || September 26, 1998 || Socorro || LINEAR || AGN || align=right | 2.7 km || 
|-id=756 bgcolor=#d6d6d6
| 85756 ||  || — || September 26, 1998 || Socorro || LINEAR || KOR || align=right | 3.6 km || 
|-id=757 bgcolor=#E9E9E9
| 85757 ||  || — || September 26, 1998 || Socorro || LINEAR || — || align=right | 2.2 km || 
|-id=758 bgcolor=#fefefe
| 85758 ||  || — || September 26, 1998 || Socorro || LINEAR || — || align=right | 2.2 km || 
|-id=759 bgcolor=#fefefe
| 85759 ||  || — || September 26, 1998 || Socorro || LINEAR || — || align=right | 2.0 km || 
|-id=760 bgcolor=#fefefe
| 85760 ||  || — || September 19, 1998 || Anderson Mesa || LONEOS || — || align=right | 2.9 km || 
|-id=761 bgcolor=#fefefe
| 85761 ||  || — || September 25, 1998 || Anderson Mesa || LONEOS || — || align=right | 1.6 km || 
|-id=762 bgcolor=#FA8072
| 85762 ||  || — || October 12, 1998 || Kitt Peak || Spacewatch || — || align=right | 1.3 km || 
|-id=763 bgcolor=#fefefe
| 85763 ||  || — || October 13, 1998 || Kitt Peak || Spacewatch || FLO || align=right | 1.4 km || 
|-id=764 bgcolor=#d6d6d6
| 85764 ||  || — || October 13, 1998 || Kitt Peak || Spacewatch || THM || align=right | 5.3 km || 
|-id=765 bgcolor=#E9E9E9
| 85765 ||  || — || October 14, 1998 || Kitt Peak || Spacewatch || — || align=right | 2.7 km || 
|-id=766 bgcolor=#fefefe
| 85766 ||  || — || October 15, 1998 || Caussols || ODAS || — || align=right | 1.7 km || 
|-id=767 bgcolor=#d6d6d6
| 85767 ||  || — || October 15, 1998 || Kitt Peak || Spacewatch || — || align=right | 3.5 km || 
|-id=768 bgcolor=#fefefe
| 85768 ||  || — || October 15, 1998 || Višnjan Observatory || K. Korlević || — || align=right | 2.2 km || 
|-id=769 bgcolor=#fefefe
| 85769 || 1998 UB || — || October 16, 1998 || Catalina || CSS || PHO || align=right | 2.9 km || 
|-id=770 bgcolor=#FFC2E0
| 85770 ||  || — || October 18, 1998 || Socorro || LINEAR || ATE || align=right data-sort-value="0.29" | 290 m || 
|-id=771 bgcolor=#E9E9E9
| 85771 ||  || — || October 20, 1998 || Caussols || ODAS || EUN || align=right | 2.6 km || 
|-id=772 bgcolor=#fefefe
| 85772 ||  || — || October 21, 1998 || Kleť || Kleť Obs. || — || align=right | 1.5 km || 
|-id=773 bgcolor=#fefefe
| 85773 Gutbezahl ||  ||  || October 25, 1998 || Cocoa || I. P. Griffin || V || align=right | 2.2 km || 
|-id=774 bgcolor=#FFC2E0
| 85774 ||  || — || October 27, 1998 || Catalina || CSS || APOPHA || align=right data-sort-value="0.94" | 940 m || 
|-id=775 bgcolor=#fefefe
| 85775 ||  || — || October 29, 1998 || Višnjan Observatory || K. Korlević || MAS || align=right | 1.8 km || 
|-id=776 bgcolor=#fefefe
| 85776 ||  || — || October 28, 1998 || Socorro || LINEAR || MAS || align=right | 1.8 km || 
|-id=777 bgcolor=#fefefe
| 85777 ||  || — || October 28, 1998 || Socorro || LINEAR || FLO || align=right | 1.4 km || 
|-id=778 bgcolor=#fefefe
| 85778 ||  || — || October 28, 1998 || Socorro || LINEAR || NYS || align=right | 1.1 km || 
|-id=779 bgcolor=#fefefe
| 85779 ||  || — || October 28, 1998 || Socorro || LINEAR || V || align=right | 1.3 km || 
|-id=780 bgcolor=#E9E9E9
| 85780 ||  || — || November 10, 1998 || Caussols || ODAS || — || align=right | 4.9 km || 
|-id=781 bgcolor=#fefefe
| 85781 ||  || — || November 10, 1998 || Caussols || ODAS || — || align=right | 2.7 km || 
|-id=782 bgcolor=#d6d6d6
| 85782 ||  || — || November 10, 1998 || Caussols || ODAS || EOS || align=right | 4.2 km || 
|-id=783 bgcolor=#fefefe
| 85783 ||  || — || November 10, 1998 || Caussols || ODAS || NYS || align=right | 1.6 km || 
|-id=784 bgcolor=#d6d6d6
| 85784 ||  || — || November 10, 1998 || Caussols || ODAS || — || align=right | 5.4 km || 
|-id=785 bgcolor=#d6d6d6
| 85785 ||  || — || November 10, 1998 || Socorro || LINEAR || — || align=right | 5.1 km || 
|-id=786 bgcolor=#E9E9E9
| 85786 ||  || — || November 10, 1998 || Socorro || LINEAR || EUN || align=right | 2.8 km || 
|-id=787 bgcolor=#fefefe
| 85787 ||  || — || November 10, 1998 || Socorro || LINEAR || V || align=right | 1.5 km || 
|-id=788 bgcolor=#fefefe
| 85788 ||  || — || November 10, 1998 || Socorro || LINEAR || V || align=right | 1.5 km || 
|-id=789 bgcolor=#fefefe
| 85789 ||  || — || November 10, 1998 || Socorro || LINEAR || NYS || align=right | 1.6 km || 
|-id=790 bgcolor=#fefefe
| 85790 ||  || — || November 10, 1998 || Socorro || LINEAR || NYS || align=right | 1.9 km || 
|-id=791 bgcolor=#E9E9E9
| 85791 ||  || — || November 10, 1998 || Socorro || LINEAR || MRX || align=right | 2.5 km || 
|-id=792 bgcolor=#E9E9E9
| 85792 ||  || — || November 10, 1998 || Socorro || LINEAR || — || align=right | 4.8 km || 
|-id=793 bgcolor=#d6d6d6
| 85793 ||  || — || November 10, 1998 || Socorro || LINEAR || — || align=right | 3.1 km || 
|-id=794 bgcolor=#E9E9E9
| 85794 ||  || — || November 11, 1998 || Caussols || ODAS || — || align=right | 1.9 km || 
|-id=795 bgcolor=#fefefe
| 85795 ||  || — || November 10, 1998 || Socorro || LINEAR || V || align=right | 1.7 km || 
|-id=796 bgcolor=#d6d6d6
| 85796 ||  || — || November 15, 1998 || Kitt Peak || Spacewatch || THM || align=right | 4.5 km || 
|-id=797 bgcolor=#fefefe
| 85797 ||  || — || November 10, 1998 || Socorro || LINEAR || NYS || align=right | 2.5 km || 
|-id=798 bgcolor=#C2FFFF
| 85798 ||  || — || November 11, 1998 || Socorro || LINEAR || L4 || align=right | 23 km || 
|-id=799 bgcolor=#fefefe
| 85799 ||  || — || November 11, 1998 || Socorro || LINEAR || — || align=right | 1.7 km || 
|-id=800 bgcolor=#E9E9E9
| 85800 ||  || — || November 14, 1998 || Socorro || LINEAR || EUN || align=right | 3.7 km || 
|}

85801–85900 

|-bgcolor=#E9E9E9
| 85801 ||  || — || November 14, 1998 || Socorro || LINEAR || — || align=right | 2.4 km || 
|-id=802 bgcolor=#E9E9E9
| 85802 ||  || — || November 10, 1998 || Caussols || ODAS || — || align=right | 2.0 km || 
|-id=803 bgcolor=#E9E9E9
| 85803 ||  || — || November 18, 1998 || Catalina || CSS || — || align=right | 5.2 km || 
|-id=804 bgcolor=#FFC2E0
| 85804 ||  || — || November 19, 1998 || Socorro || LINEAR || AMO +1km || align=right | 2.3 km || 
|-id=805 bgcolor=#fefefe
| 85805 ||  || — || November 24, 1998 || Baton Rouge || W. R. Cooney Jr., P. M. Motl || — || align=right | 3.9 km || 
|-id=806 bgcolor=#fefefe
| 85806 ||  || — || November 25, 1998 || Oizumi || T. Kobayashi || — || align=right | 3.1 km || 
|-id=807 bgcolor=#C2FFFF
| 85807 ||  || — || November 21, 1998 || Socorro || LINEAR || L4 || align=right | 22 km || 
|-id=808 bgcolor=#fefefe
| 85808 ||  || — || November 21, 1998 || Socorro || LINEAR || V || align=right | 1.7 km || 
|-id=809 bgcolor=#E9E9E9
| 85809 ||  || — || November 21, 1998 || Socorro || LINEAR || PAE || align=right | 5.9 km || 
|-id=810 bgcolor=#fefefe
| 85810 ||  || — || November 21, 1998 || Socorro || LINEAR || — || align=right | 1.8 km || 
|-id=811 bgcolor=#fefefe
| 85811 ||  || — || November 21, 1998 || Socorro || LINEAR || — || align=right | 2.0 km || 
|-id=812 bgcolor=#d6d6d6
| 85812 ||  || — || November 18, 1998 || Socorro || LINEAR || — || align=right | 4.8 km || 
|-id=813 bgcolor=#E9E9E9
| 85813 ||  || — || November 16, 1998 || Kitt Peak || Spacewatch || — || align=right | 1.7 km || 
|-id=814 bgcolor=#fefefe
| 85814 ||  || — || November 19, 1998 || Catalina || CSS || PHO || align=right | 3.0 km || 
|-id=815 bgcolor=#fefefe
| 85815 ||  || — || November 24, 1998 || Socorro || LINEAR || MAS || align=right | 1.7 km || 
|-id=816 bgcolor=#fefefe
| 85816 || 1998 XG || — || December 8, 1998 || Kleť || Kleť Obs. || FLO || align=right | 1.5 km || 
|-id=817 bgcolor=#fefefe
| 85817 ||  || — || December 7, 1998 || Caussols || ODAS || MAS || align=right | 1.5 km || 
|-id=818 bgcolor=#FFC2E0
| 85818 ||  || — || December 10, 1998 || Socorro || LINEAR || APO +1km || align=right | 2.0 km || 
|-id=819 bgcolor=#fefefe
| 85819 ||  || — || December 12, 1998 || San Marcello || M. Tombelli, A. Boattini || — || align=right | 1.7 km || 
|-id=820 bgcolor=#d6d6d6
| 85820 ||  || — || December 14, 1998 || Višnjan Observatory || K. Korlević || — || align=right | 3.4 km || 
|-id=821 bgcolor=#fefefe
| 85821 ||  || — || December 15, 1998 || Caussols || ODAS || — || align=right | 4.1 km || 
|-id=822 bgcolor=#C2FFFF
| 85822 ||  || — || December 8, 1998 || Caussols || ODAS || L4 || align=right | 12 km || 
|-id=823 bgcolor=#d6d6d6
| 85823 ||  || — || December 10, 1998 || Kitt Peak || Spacewatch || — || align=right | 5.5 km || 
|-id=824 bgcolor=#E9E9E9
| 85824 ||  || — || December 10, 1998 || Kitt Peak || Spacewatch || — || align=right | 2.2 km || 
|-id=825 bgcolor=#fefefe
| 85825 ||  || — || December 11, 1998 || Kitt Peak || Spacewatch || V || align=right | 1.8 km || 
|-id=826 bgcolor=#d6d6d6
| 85826 ||  || — || December 14, 1998 || Socorro || LINEAR || — || align=right | 4.7 km || 
|-id=827 bgcolor=#fefefe
| 85827 ||  || — || December 14, 1998 || Socorro || LINEAR || — || align=right | 2.6 km || 
|-id=828 bgcolor=#fefefe
| 85828 ||  || — || December 14, 1998 || Socorro || LINEAR || FLO || align=right | 3.3 km || 
|-id=829 bgcolor=#fefefe
| 85829 ||  || — || December 15, 1998 || Socorro || LINEAR || MAS || align=right | 1.9 km || 
|-id=830 bgcolor=#E9E9E9
| 85830 ||  || — || December 15, 1998 || Socorro || LINEAR || — || align=right | 4.5 km || 
|-id=831 bgcolor=#E9E9E9
| 85831 ||  || — || December 14, 1998 || Socorro || LINEAR || — || align=right | 3.4 km || 
|-id=832 bgcolor=#fefefe
| 85832 ||  || — || December 14, 1998 || Socorro || LINEAR || NYS || align=right | 2.0 km || 
|-id=833 bgcolor=#E9E9E9
| 85833 ||  || — || December 14, 1998 || Socorro || LINEAR || — || align=right | 5.1 km || 
|-id=834 bgcolor=#fefefe
| 85834 ||  || — || December 14, 1998 || Socorro || LINEAR || NYS || align=right | 3.0 km || 
|-id=835 bgcolor=#fefefe
| 85835 ||  || — || December 15, 1998 || Socorro || LINEAR || — || align=right | 1.5 km || 
|-id=836 bgcolor=#fefefe
| 85836 ||  || — || December 17, 1998 || Caussols || ODAS || MAS || align=right | 2.4 km || 
|-id=837 bgcolor=#fefefe
| 85837 ||  || — || December 17, 1998 || Caussols || ODAS || — || align=right | 2.5 km || 
|-id=838 bgcolor=#fefefe
| 85838 ||  || — || December 17, 1998 || Caussols || ODAS || V || align=right | 1.9 km || 
|-id=839 bgcolor=#FFC2E0
| 85839 ||  || — || December 17, 1998 || Socorro || LINEAR || AMO +1km || align=right | 1.1 km || 
|-id=840 bgcolor=#d6d6d6
| 85840 ||  || — || December 18, 1998 || Kleť || Kleť Obs. || EOS || align=right | 5.1 km || 
|-id=841 bgcolor=#E9E9E9
| 85841 ||  || — || December 20, 1998 || Ondřejov || A. Kolář, L. Kotková || — || align=right | 2.3 km || 
|-id=842 bgcolor=#E9E9E9
| 85842 ||  || — || December 22, 1998 || Oizumi || T. Kobayashi || — || align=right | 3.7 km || 
|-id=843 bgcolor=#fefefe
| 85843 ||  || — || December 25, 1998 || Višnjan Observatory || K. Korlević, M. Jurić || — || align=right | 2.2 km || 
|-id=844 bgcolor=#d6d6d6
| 85844 ||  || — || December 22, 1998 || Kitt Peak || Spacewatch || — || align=right | 5.4 km || 
|-id=845 bgcolor=#fefefe
| 85845 ||  || — || December 22, 1998 || Kitt Peak || Spacewatch || — || align=right | 1.8 km || 
|-id=846 bgcolor=#fefefe
| 85846 ||  || — || December 25, 1998 || Kitt Peak || Spacewatch || V || align=right | 1.4 km || 
|-id=847 bgcolor=#E9E9E9
| 85847 ||  || — || December 19, 1998 || Socorro || LINEAR || — || align=right | 2.6 km || 
|-id=848 bgcolor=#FA8072
| 85848 ||  || — || December 28, 1998 || Kitt Peak || Spacewatch || — || align=right | 1.1 km || 
|-id=849 bgcolor=#fefefe
| 85849 || 1999 AW || — || January 7, 1999 || Oizumi || T. Kobayashi || — || align=right | 2.9 km || 
|-id=850 bgcolor=#fefefe
| 85850 ||  || — || January 9, 1999 || Oizumi || T. Kobayashi || — || align=right | 2.7 km || 
|-id=851 bgcolor=#fefefe
| 85851 ||  || — || January 11, 1999 || Oizumi || T. Kobayashi || — || align=right | 6.8 km || 
|-id=852 bgcolor=#E9E9E9
| 85852 ||  || — || January 11, 1999 || Oizumi || T. Kobayashi || — || align=right | 5.2 km || 
|-id=853 bgcolor=#E9E9E9
| 85853 ||  || — || January 7, 1999 || Kitt Peak || Spacewatch || — || align=right | 4.0 km || 
|-id=854 bgcolor=#E9E9E9
| 85854 ||  || — || January 7, 1999 || Kitt Peak || Spacewatch || — || align=right | 2.6 km || 
|-id=855 bgcolor=#fefefe
| 85855 ||  || — || January 9, 1999 || Kitt Peak || Spacewatch || — || align=right | 2.0 km || 
|-id=856 bgcolor=#fefefe
| 85856 ||  || — || January 13, 1999 || Kitt Peak || Spacewatch || FLO || align=right | 3.2 km || 
|-id=857 bgcolor=#fefefe
| 85857 ||  || — || January 15, 1999 || Fair Oaks Ranch || J. V. McClusky || — || align=right | 2.7 km || 
|-id=858 bgcolor=#fefefe
| 85858 ||  || — || January 9, 1999 || Uenohara || N. Kawasato || — || align=right | 2.4 km || 
|-id=859 bgcolor=#fefefe
| 85859 ||  || — || January 11, 1999 || Kitt Peak || Spacewatch || — || align=right data-sort-value="0.97" | 970 m || 
|-id=860 bgcolor=#E9E9E9
| 85860 ||  || — || January 13, 1999 || Kitt Peak || Spacewatch || — || align=right | 1.7 km || 
|-id=861 bgcolor=#fefefe
| 85861 ||  || — || January 15, 1999 || Kitt Peak || Spacewatch || V || align=right | 2.0 km || 
|-id=862 bgcolor=#fefefe
| 85862 ||  || — || January 13, 1999 || Anderson Mesa || LONEOS || — || align=right | 3.3 km || 
|-id=863 bgcolor=#fefefe
| 85863 || 1999 BG || — || January 16, 1999 || Oizumi || T. Kobayashi || V || align=right | 2.0 km || 
|-id=864 bgcolor=#fefefe
| 85864 ||  || — || January 21, 1999 || Kleť || Kleť Obs. || MAS || align=right | 1.7 km || 
|-id=865 bgcolor=#E9E9E9
| 85865 ||  || — || January 22, 1999 || Višnjan Observatory || K. Korlević || — || align=right | 2.8 km || 
|-id=866 bgcolor=#E9E9E9
| 85866 ||  || — || January 22, 1999 || Višnjan Observatory || K. Korlević || — || align=right | 3.3 km || 
|-id=867 bgcolor=#FFC2E0
| 85867 ||  || — || January 23, 1999 || Višnjan Observatory || K. Korlević || AMO +1km || align=right data-sort-value="0.85" | 850 m || 
|-id=868 bgcolor=#E9E9E9
| 85868 ||  || — || January 23, 1999 || Višnjan Observatory || K. Korlević || — || align=right | 2.4 km || 
|-id=869 bgcolor=#fefefe
| 85869 ||  || — || January 23, 1999 || Višnjan Observatory || K. Korlević || V || align=right | 2.0 km || 
|-id=870 bgcolor=#E9E9E9
| 85870 ||  || — || January 16, 1999 || Socorro || LINEAR || — || align=right | 4.9 km || 
|-id=871 bgcolor=#E9E9E9
| 85871 ||  || — || January 19, 1999 || Kitt Peak || Spacewatch || — || align=right | 2.8 km || 
|-id=872 bgcolor=#E9E9E9
| 85872 ||  || — || January 19, 1999 || Kitt Peak || Spacewatch || — || align=right | 3.1 km || 
|-id=873 bgcolor=#fefefe
| 85873 ||  || — || February 5, 1999 || Gekko || T. Kagawa || FLO || align=right | 1.9 km || 
|-id=874 bgcolor=#fefefe
| 85874 ||  || — || February 9, 1999 || Oizumi || T. Kobayashi || FLO || align=right | 2.0 km || 
|-id=875 bgcolor=#E9E9E9
| 85875 ||  || — || February 12, 1999 || Oizumi || T. Kobayashi || — || align=right | 3.6 km || 
|-id=876 bgcolor=#fefefe
| 85876 ||  || — || February 10, 1999 || Socorro || LINEAR || — || align=right | 3.9 km || 
|-id=877 bgcolor=#fefefe
| 85877 ||  || — || February 13, 1999 || Farpoint || G. Hug, G. Bell || V || align=right | 1.5 km || 
|-id=878 bgcolor=#fefefe
| 85878 Guzik ||  ||  || February 13, 1999 || Baton Rouge || W. R. Cooney Jr., E. Kandler || V || align=right | 1.4 km || 
|-id=879 bgcolor=#fefefe
| 85879 ||  || — || February 12, 1999 || Socorro || LINEAR || — || align=right | 2.7 km || 
|-id=880 bgcolor=#E9E9E9
| 85880 ||  || — || February 15, 1999 || Višnjan Observatory || K. Korlević || — || align=right | 4.2 km || 
|-id=881 bgcolor=#fefefe
| 85881 ||  || — || February 10, 1999 || Socorro || LINEAR || — || align=right | 6.0 km || 
|-id=882 bgcolor=#fefefe
| 85882 ||  || — || February 10, 1999 || Socorro || LINEAR || — || align=right | 2.2 km || 
|-id=883 bgcolor=#E9E9E9
| 85883 ||  || — || February 10, 1999 || Socorro || LINEAR || — || align=right | 3.4 km || 
|-id=884 bgcolor=#E9E9E9
| 85884 ||  || — || February 10, 1999 || Socorro || LINEAR || — || align=right | 3.4 km || 
|-id=885 bgcolor=#fefefe
| 85885 ||  || — || February 10, 1999 || Socorro || LINEAR || — || align=right | 2.9 km || 
|-id=886 bgcolor=#E9E9E9
| 85886 ||  || — || February 10, 1999 || Socorro || LINEAR || — || align=right | 3.6 km || 
|-id=887 bgcolor=#fefefe
| 85887 ||  || — || February 10, 1999 || Socorro || LINEAR || KLI || align=right | 4.9 km || 
|-id=888 bgcolor=#E9E9E9
| 85888 ||  || — || February 10, 1999 || Socorro || LINEAR || EUN || align=right | 3.8 km || 
|-id=889 bgcolor=#E9E9E9
| 85889 ||  || — || February 10, 1999 || Socorro || LINEAR || EUN || align=right | 3.9 km || 
|-id=890 bgcolor=#fefefe
| 85890 ||  || — || February 10, 1999 || Socorro || LINEAR || — || align=right | 2.6 km || 
|-id=891 bgcolor=#E9E9E9
| 85891 ||  || — || February 10, 1999 || Socorro || LINEAR || ADE || align=right | 6.2 km || 
|-id=892 bgcolor=#E9E9E9
| 85892 ||  || — || February 10, 1999 || Socorro || LINEAR || MIT || align=right | 6.6 km || 
|-id=893 bgcolor=#E9E9E9
| 85893 ||  || — || February 10, 1999 || Socorro || LINEAR || — || align=right | 2.4 km || 
|-id=894 bgcolor=#E9E9E9
| 85894 ||  || — || February 10, 1999 || Socorro || LINEAR || — || align=right | 4.6 km || 
|-id=895 bgcolor=#E9E9E9
| 85895 ||  || — || February 10, 1999 || Socorro || LINEAR || — || align=right | 3.5 km || 
|-id=896 bgcolor=#E9E9E9
| 85896 ||  || — || February 10, 1999 || Socorro || LINEAR || — || align=right | 4.1 km || 
|-id=897 bgcolor=#fefefe
| 85897 ||  || — || February 10, 1999 || Socorro || LINEAR || — || align=right | 2.3 km || 
|-id=898 bgcolor=#fefefe
| 85898 ||  || — || February 10, 1999 || Socorro || LINEAR || V || align=right | 2.2 km || 
|-id=899 bgcolor=#fefefe
| 85899 ||  || — || February 10, 1999 || Socorro || LINEAR || NYS || align=right | 1.9 km || 
|-id=900 bgcolor=#fefefe
| 85900 ||  || — || February 10, 1999 || Socorro || LINEAR || NYS || align=right | 2.2 km || 
|}

85901–86000 

|-bgcolor=#E9E9E9
| 85901 ||  || — || February 12, 1999 || Socorro || LINEAR || — || align=right | 3.6 km || 
|-id=902 bgcolor=#fefefe
| 85902 ||  || — || February 12, 1999 || Socorro || LINEAR || V || align=right | 3.1 km || 
|-id=903 bgcolor=#E9E9E9
| 85903 ||  || — || February 12, 1999 || Socorro || LINEAR || — || align=right | 6.2 km || 
|-id=904 bgcolor=#E9E9E9
| 85904 ||  || — || February 12, 1999 || Socorro || LINEAR || — || align=right | 3.9 km || 
|-id=905 bgcolor=#E9E9E9
| 85905 ||  || — || February 12, 1999 || Socorro || LINEAR || — || align=right | 2.2 km || 
|-id=906 bgcolor=#fefefe
| 85906 ||  || — || February 12, 1999 || Socorro || LINEAR || V || align=right | 1.9 km || 
|-id=907 bgcolor=#fefefe
| 85907 ||  || — || February 10, 1999 || Socorro || LINEAR || NYS || align=right | 2.6 km || 
|-id=908 bgcolor=#fefefe
| 85908 ||  || — || February 10, 1999 || Socorro || LINEAR || FLO || align=right | 1.8 km || 
|-id=909 bgcolor=#fefefe
| 85909 ||  || — || February 10, 1999 || Socorro || LINEAR || — || align=right | 2.1 km || 
|-id=910 bgcolor=#E9E9E9
| 85910 ||  || — || February 10, 1999 || Socorro || LINEAR || — || align=right | 3.3 km || 
|-id=911 bgcolor=#E9E9E9
| 85911 ||  || — || February 10, 1999 || Socorro || LINEAR || — || align=right | 4.1 km || 
|-id=912 bgcolor=#E9E9E9
| 85912 ||  || — || February 10, 1999 || Socorro || LINEAR || — || align=right | 3.2 km || 
|-id=913 bgcolor=#E9E9E9
| 85913 ||  || — || February 10, 1999 || Socorro || LINEAR || — || align=right | 3.3 km || 
|-id=914 bgcolor=#E9E9E9
| 85914 ||  || — || February 10, 1999 || Socorro || LINEAR || — || align=right | 4.0 km || 
|-id=915 bgcolor=#E9E9E9
| 85915 ||  || — || February 10, 1999 || Socorro || LINEAR || KRM || align=right | 6.8 km || 
|-id=916 bgcolor=#E9E9E9
| 85916 ||  || — || February 10, 1999 || Socorro || LINEAR || — || align=right | 4.9 km || 
|-id=917 bgcolor=#E9E9E9
| 85917 ||  || — || February 10, 1999 || Socorro || LINEAR || — || align=right | 3.3 km || 
|-id=918 bgcolor=#E9E9E9
| 85918 ||  || — || February 10, 1999 || Socorro || LINEAR || — || align=right | 4.5 km || 
|-id=919 bgcolor=#fefefe
| 85919 ||  || — || February 10, 1999 || Socorro || LINEAR || FLO || align=right | 2.2 km || 
|-id=920 bgcolor=#E9E9E9
| 85920 ||  || — || February 10, 1999 || Socorro || LINEAR || EUN || align=right | 3.0 km || 
|-id=921 bgcolor=#E9E9E9
| 85921 ||  || — || February 10, 1999 || Socorro || LINEAR || — || align=right | 2.7 km || 
|-id=922 bgcolor=#fefefe
| 85922 ||  || — || February 12, 1999 || Socorro || LINEAR || V || align=right | 2.3 km || 
|-id=923 bgcolor=#E9E9E9
| 85923 ||  || — || February 12, 1999 || Socorro || LINEAR || MAR || align=right | 3.5 km || 
|-id=924 bgcolor=#E9E9E9
| 85924 ||  || — || February 12, 1999 || Socorro || LINEAR || — || align=right | 4.3 km || 
|-id=925 bgcolor=#fefefe
| 85925 ||  || — || February 12, 1999 || Socorro || LINEAR || — || align=right | 2.3 km || 
|-id=926 bgcolor=#E9E9E9
| 85926 ||  || — || February 12, 1999 || Socorro || LINEAR || — || align=right | 4.1 km || 
|-id=927 bgcolor=#E9E9E9
| 85927 ||  || — || February 12, 1999 || Socorro || LINEAR || — || align=right | 6.0 km || 
|-id=928 bgcolor=#E9E9E9
| 85928 ||  || — || February 11, 1999 || Socorro || LINEAR || EUN || align=right | 3.0 km || 
|-id=929 bgcolor=#E9E9E9
| 85929 ||  || — || February 11, 1999 || Socorro || LINEAR || — || align=right | 4.7 km || 
|-id=930 bgcolor=#E9E9E9
| 85930 ||  || — || February 11, 1999 || Socorro || LINEAR || — || align=right | 4.4 km || 
|-id=931 bgcolor=#d6d6d6
| 85931 ||  || — || February 11, 1999 || Socorro || LINEAR || — || align=right | 9.2 km || 
|-id=932 bgcolor=#fefefe
| 85932 ||  || — || February 10, 1999 || Kitt Peak || Spacewatch || — || align=right | 2.6 km || 
|-id=933 bgcolor=#fefefe
| 85933 ||  || — || February 9, 1999 || Kitt Peak || Spacewatch || NYS || align=right | 1.3 km || 
|-id=934 bgcolor=#E9E9E9
| 85934 ||  || — || February 10, 1999 || Kitt Peak || Spacewatch || — || align=right | 1.7 km || 
|-id=935 bgcolor=#E9E9E9
| 85935 ||  || — || February 13, 1999 || Kitt Peak || Spacewatch || — || align=right | 1.5 km || 
|-id=936 bgcolor=#E9E9E9
| 85936 ||  || — || February 13, 1999 || Kitt Peak || Spacewatch || — || align=right | 2.7 km || 
|-id=937 bgcolor=#fefefe
| 85937 ||  || — || February 17, 1999 || Socorro || LINEAR || PHO || align=right | 3.6 km || 
|-id=938 bgcolor=#FFC2E0
| 85938 ||  || — || February 24, 1999 || Socorro || LINEAR || APOPHAmoon || align=right data-sort-value="0.68" | 680 m || 
|-id=939 bgcolor=#E9E9E9
| 85939 ||  || — || February 17, 1999 || Socorro || LINEAR || EUN || align=right | 3.6 km || 
|-id=940 bgcolor=#E9E9E9
| 85940 ||  || — || February 18, 1999 || Anderson Mesa || LONEOS || — || align=right | 5.0 km || 
|-id=941 bgcolor=#E9E9E9
| 85941 ||  || — || February 18, 1999 || Haleakala || NEAT || — || align=right | 4.8 km || 
|-id=942 bgcolor=#E9E9E9
| 85942 ||  || — || March 12, 1999 || Kitt Peak || Spacewatch || — || align=right | 4.1 km || 
|-id=943 bgcolor=#E9E9E9
| 85943 ||  || — || March 12, 1999 || Kitt Peak || Spacewatch || — || align=right | 2.4 km || 
|-id=944 bgcolor=#E9E9E9
| 85944 ||  || — || March 12, 1999 || Kitt Peak || Spacewatch || — || align=right | 2.2 km || 
|-id=945 bgcolor=#fefefe
| 85945 ||  || — || March 12, 1999 || Kitt Peak || Spacewatch || — || align=right | 2.2 km || 
|-id=946 bgcolor=#E9E9E9
| 85946 ||  || — || March 14, 1999 || Kitt Peak || Spacewatch || — || align=right | 2.8 km || 
|-id=947 bgcolor=#E9E9E9
| 85947 ||  || — || March 12, 1999 || Socorro || LINEAR || BRU || align=right | 7.6 km || 
|-id=948 bgcolor=#E9E9E9
| 85948 ||  || — || March 10, 1999 || Kitt Peak || Spacewatch || — || align=right | 3.2 km || 
|-id=949 bgcolor=#E9E9E9
| 85949 ||  || — || March 10, 1999 || Prescott || P. G. Comba || AER || align=right | 2.6 km || 
|-id=950 bgcolor=#fefefe
| 85950 ||  || — || March 20, 1999 || Socorro || LINEAR || — || align=right | 7.9 km || 
|-id=951 bgcolor=#E9E9E9
| 85951 ||  || — || March 22, 1999 || Anderson Mesa || LONEOS || — || align=right | 3.7 km || 
|-id=952 bgcolor=#E9E9E9
| 85952 ||  || — || March 18, 1999 || Kitt Peak || Spacewatch || — || align=right | 3.0 km || 
|-id=953 bgcolor=#FFC2E0
| 85953 ||  || — || March 24, 1999 || Socorro || LINEAR || ATE +1km || align=right data-sort-value="0.59" | 590 m || 
|-id=954 bgcolor=#fefefe
| 85954 ||  || — || March 19, 1999 || Socorro || LINEAR || — || align=right | 3.0 km || 
|-id=955 bgcolor=#d6d6d6
| 85955 ||  || — || March 19, 1999 || Socorro || LINEAR || — || align=right | 7.2 km || 
|-id=956 bgcolor=#fefefe
| 85956 ||  || — || March 20, 1999 || Socorro || LINEAR || — || align=right | 2.0 km || 
|-id=957 bgcolor=#fefefe
| 85957 ||  || — || March 20, 1999 || Socorro || LINEAR || — || align=right | 2.2 km || 
|-id=958 bgcolor=#fefefe
| 85958 ||  || — || March 20, 1999 || Socorro || LINEAR || FLO || align=right | 2.3 km || 
|-id=959 bgcolor=#fefefe
| 85959 ||  || — || March 20, 1999 || Socorro || LINEAR || V || align=right | 2.0 km || 
|-id=960 bgcolor=#E9E9E9
| 85960 ||  || — || March 20, 1999 || Socorro || LINEAR || GEF || align=right | 4.7 km || 
|-id=961 bgcolor=#fefefe
| 85961 ||  || — || March 20, 1999 || Socorro || LINEAR || NYS || align=right | 2.1 km || 
|-id=962 bgcolor=#E9E9E9
| 85962 ||  || — || March 20, 1999 || Socorro || LINEAR || — || align=right | 1.9 km || 
|-id=963 bgcolor=#E9E9E9
| 85963 ||  || — || March 20, 1999 || Socorro || LINEAR || EUN || align=right | 2.8 km || 
|-id=964 bgcolor=#E9E9E9
| 85964 ||  || — || March 20, 1999 || Socorro || LINEAR || — || align=right | 3.8 km || 
|-id=965 bgcolor=#E9E9E9
| 85965 ||  || — || March 22, 1999 || Anderson Mesa || LONEOS || — || align=right | 5.6 km || 
|-id=966 bgcolor=#fefefe
| 85966 ||  || — || March 22, 1999 || Anderson Mesa || LONEOS || — || align=right | 3.7 km || 
|-id=967 bgcolor=#E9E9E9
| 85967 ||  || — || April 7, 1999 || Oizumi || T. Kobayashi || MAR || align=right | 3.4 km || 
|-id=968 bgcolor=#fefefe
| 85968 ||  || — || April 8, 1999 || Gekko || T. Kagawa || — || align=right | 3.4 km || 
|-id=969 bgcolor=#d6d6d6
| 85969 ||  || — || April 8, 1999 || Bergisch Gladbach || W. Bickel || HYG || align=right | 5.5 km || 
|-id=970 bgcolor=#E9E9E9
| 85970 Fundaçãoterra ||  ||  || April 11, 1999 || Wykrota || C. Jacques || — || align=right | 4.4 km || 
|-id=971 bgcolor=#d6d6d6
| 85971 ||  || — || April 15, 1999 || Woomera || F. B. Zoltowski || — || align=right | 6.3 km || 
|-id=972 bgcolor=#E9E9E9
| 85972 ||  || — || April 6, 1999 || Anderson Mesa || LONEOS || — || align=right | 5.9 km || 
|-id=973 bgcolor=#E9E9E9
| 85973 ||  || — || April 15, 1999 || Socorro || LINEAR || — || align=right | 5.9 km || 
|-id=974 bgcolor=#E9E9E9
| 85974 ||  || — || April 15, 1999 || Socorro || LINEAR || — || align=right | 3.2 km || 
|-id=975 bgcolor=#E9E9E9
| 85975 ||  || — || April 12, 1999 || Socorro || LINEAR || MAR || align=right | 2.7 km || 
|-id=976 bgcolor=#E9E9E9
| 85976 ||  || — || April 12, 1999 || Socorro || LINEAR || EUN || align=right | 2.8 km || 
|-id=977 bgcolor=#E9E9E9
| 85977 ||  || — || April 12, 1999 || Socorro || LINEAR || — || align=right | 5.7 km || 
|-id=978 bgcolor=#E9E9E9
| 85978 ||  || — || April 12, 1999 || Socorro || LINEAR || — || align=right | 5.2 km || 
|-id=979 bgcolor=#E9E9E9
| 85979 ||  || — || April 12, 1999 || Socorro || LINEAR || — || align=right | 4.7 km || 
|-id=980 bgcolor=#E9E9E9
| 85980 ||  || — || April 20, 1999 || Oohira || T. Urata || RAF || align=right | 2.5 km || 
|-id=981 bgcolor=#E9E9E9
| 85981 ||  || — || April 18, 1999 || Catalina || CSS || — || align=right | 2.9 km || 
|-id=982 bgcolor=#E9E9E9
| 85982 ||  || — || April 19, 1999 || Kitt Peak || Spacewatch || — || align=right | 5.4 km || 
|-id=983 bgcolor=#E9E9E9
| 85983 ||  || — || April 19, 1999 || Kitt Peak || Spacewatch || — || align=right | 3.5 km || 
|-id=984 bgcolor=#d6d6d6
| 85984 ||  || — || April 17, 1999 || Socorro || LINEAR || — || align=right | 3.2 km || 
|-id=985 bgcolor=#E9E9E9
| 85985 || 1999 JW || — || May 5, 1999 || Xinglong || SCAP || — || align=right | 6.0 km || 
|-id=986 bgcolor=#E9E9E9
| 85986 || 1999 JX || — || May 6, 1999 || Xinglong || SCAP || — || align=right | 5.7 km || 
|-id=987 bgcolor=#fefefe
| 85987 ||  || — || May 12, 1999 || Socorro || LINEAR || H || align=right | 1.8 km || 
|-id=988 bgcolor=#E9E9E9
| 85988 ||  || — || May 12, 1999 || Socorro || LINEAR || — || align=right | 6.4 km || 
|-id=989 bgcolor=#FFC2E0
| 85989 ||  || — || May 12, 1999 || Anderson Mesa || LONEOS || ATE +1kmPHA || align=right | 1.5 km || 
|-id=990 bgcolor=#FFC2E0
| 85990 ||  || — || May 13, 1999 || Socorro || LINEAR || APOPHA || align=right data-sort-value="0.45" | 450 m || 
|-id=991 bgcolor=#d6d6d6
| 85991 ||  || — || May 15, 1999 || Kitt Peak || Spacewatch || — || align=right | 4.5 km || 
|-id=992 bgcolor=#d6d6d6
| 85992 ||  || — || May 10, 1999 || Socorro || LINEAR || — || align=right | 6.4 km || 
|-id=993 bgcolor=#E9E9E9
| 85993 ||  || — || May 10, 1999 || Socorro || LINEAR || AEO || align=right | 2.5 km || 
|-id=994 bgcolor=#d6d6d6
| 85994 ||  || — || May 10, 1999 || Socorro || LINEAR || — || align=right | 5.1 km || 
|-id=995 bgcolor=#d6d6d6
| 85995 ||  || — || May 10, 1999 || Socorro || LINEAR || — || align=right | 4.5 km || 
|-id=996 bgcolor=#E9E9E9
| 85996 ||  || — || May 12, 1999 || Socorro || LINEAR || MAR || align=right | 2.6 km || 
|-id=997 bgcolor=#E9E9E9
| 85997 ||  || — || May 12, 1999 || Socorro || LINEAR || — || align=right | 3.4 km || 
|-id=998 bgcolor=#E9E9E9
| 85998 ||  || — || May 12, 1999 || Socorro || LINEAR || JUN || align=right | 2.3 km || 
|-id=999 bgcolor=#fefefe
| 85999 ||  || — || May 12, 1999 || Socorro || LINEAR || V || align=right | 2.2 km || 
|-id=000 bgcolor=#E9E9E9
| 86000 ||  || — || May 13, 1999 || Socorro || LINEAR || MAR || align=right | 2.4 km || 
|}

References

External links 
 Discovery Circumstances: Numbered Minor Planets (85001)–(90000) (IAU Minor Planet Center)

0085